= Kataragama (disambiguation) =

Kataragama may mean:

- Kataragama, a pilgrimage town in Sri Lanka
- Kataragama temple, a temple complex in Sri Lanka to Skanda-Murkan, a Hindu deity; or Kataragamadevio a Buddhist deity
- Kataragama deviyo, a Hindu or Buddhist god worshipped at Kataragama
- Kataragama Peak, a mountain near Kataragama, Sri Lanka
