= Kataragama Temple =

Temple complex in Kataragama, Sri Lanka

Kataragama Maha Devale
- රුහුණු මහා කතරගම දේවාලය கதிர்காமம் முருகன் கோவில்
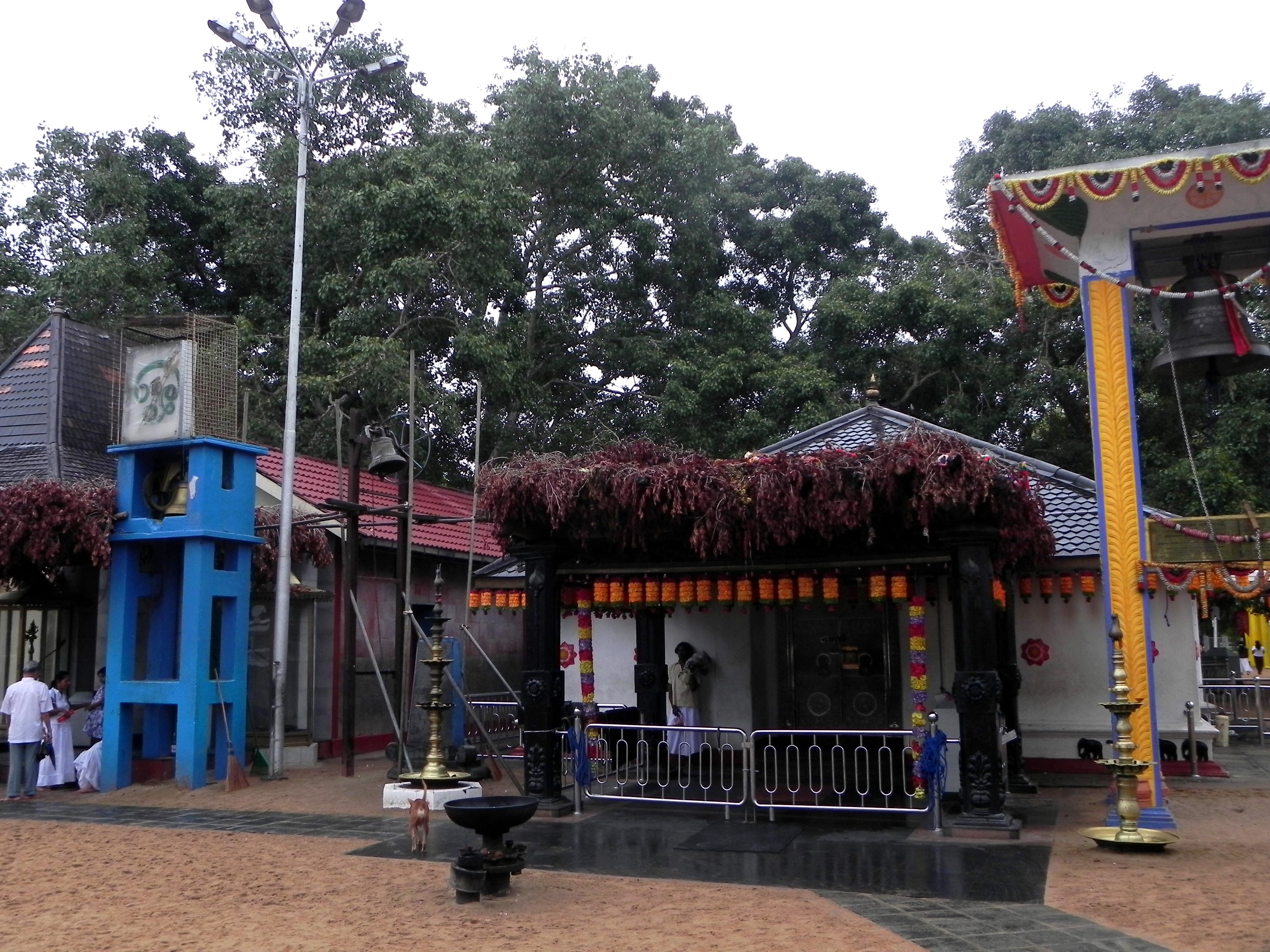
- Maha Devale / Murugan Kovil

- Location in Sri Lanka

Religion
- Affiliation: Sinhalese Deity Concept & Hinduism
- District: Monaragala District
- Province: Uva Province
- Region: Wellassa region
- Deity: Initially: Kataragama deviyo as King Mahasena of Kataragama; Later:Kataragama deviyo as Hindu god Murugan

Location
- Location: Kataragama, Sri Lanka
- Coordinates: 6°25′N 81°20′E

Architecture
- Type: Devalaya
- Founder: King Dutugemunu (According to legends The Kataragama Mahasena Devalaya, dedicated to Kataragama State King Mahasena who was deified among the Sinhalese people): Initially: 2 Century BCE; latter:c. 1100 – 15th century & 19 th century

Kataragama Devalaya (Sinhala: රුහුණු මහා කතරගම දේවාලය, lit. 'Ruhuṇu Mahā Kataragama Dēvālaya', Tamil: கதிர்காமம் முருகன் கோயில், lit. 'Katirkāmam Murugan Kōvil') in Kataragama, Sri Lanka, is a temple complex dedicated to Buddhist guardian deity Kataragama deviyo and Hindu War God Murugan. It is one of the few religious sites in Sri Lanka that is venerated by the Buddhists, Hindus, Muslims and the Vedda people. For most of the past millennia, it was a jungle shrine very difficult to access; today it is accessible by an all-weather road. The shrines and the nearby Kiri Vehera are managed by Buddhists, the shrines dedicated to Teyvāṉai and Shiva are managed by Hindus and the mosque by Muslims.

The shrine has for centuries attracted Tamil Hindus from Sri Lanka and South India who undertook an arduous pilgrimage on foot. Since the latter half of the 20th century, the site has risen dramatically among Sinhalese Buddhists who today constitute majority of the visitors.

The cult of Kataragama deviyo has become the most popular amongst the Sinhalese people. A number of legends and myths are associated with the deity and the location, differing by religion, ethnic affiliation and time. These legends are changing with the deity's burgeoning popularity with Buddhists, as the Buddhist ritual specialists and clergy try to accommodate the deity within Buddhist ideals of nontheism. With the change in devotees, the mode of worship and festivals has changed from that of Hindu orientation to one that accommodates Buddhist rituals and theology. It is difficult to reconstruct the factual history of the place and the reason for its popularity amongst Sri Lankans and Indians based on legends and available archeological and literary evidence alone, although the place seems to have a venerable history. The lack of clear historic records and resultant legends and myths fuel the conflict between Buddhists and Hindus as to the ownership and the mode of worship at Kataragama.

The priests of the temple are known as Kapuralas and are believed to be descended from Vedda people. Veddas, too, have a claim on the temple, a nearby mountain peak and locality through a number of legends. There is a mosque and a few tombs of Muslim pious men buried nearby. The temple complex is also connected to other similar temples in Eastern Province dedicated to Murugan which are along the path of pilgrimage from Jaffna in the north to Kataragama in the south of the island; Arunagirinathar traversed this pilgrimage route in the 15th century. The entire temple complex was declared a holy place by the government of Sri Lanka in the 1950s; since then political leaders have contributed for its maintenance and upkeep.

== History ==
=== Origin theories ===
There are number of theories as to the origin of the shrine. According to Heinz Bechert and Paul Younger, the mode of veneration and rituals connected with Kataragama deviyo is a survival of indigenous Vedda mode of veneration that preceded the arrival of Buddhist and Indo-Aryan cultural influences from North India in Sri Lanka in the last centuries BCE, although Hindus, Buddhists and even Muslims have tried to co-opt the deity, rituals and the shrine. But according to S. Pathmanathan, the original Kataragama shrine was established as an adjunct guardian deity shrine to Skanda-Kumara within a Buddhist temple complex. This particular shrine then became idealized as the very spot where Valli met Murukan amongst local Tamils and Sinhalese, and Kataragama deviyo subsumed the identity of Skanda-Kumara and became a deity on his own right with rituals and pilgrimage. According to Pathmanathan, it happened after the 13th century CE when Murukan became popular amongst Tamils and before the 15th century CE when the poet Arunagirinathar identified the very location as a sacred spot. The deity among the Veddas is referred as O' Vedda or Oya Vedda, meaning "river hunter".

=== Literary evidence ===
The first literary mention of Kataragama in a context of a sacred place to kandha-Murugan is in its Tamil form Kathirkamam in the 15th-century devotional poems of Arunagirinathar. Tradition claims that he visited the forest shrine when he composed the poems. According to his poems, the deity dwelt on top of a mountain. The first mention of Kataragama deviyo in the form Khattugama, as a guardian deity of Sri Lanka and its Buddhist relics, was in the Pali chronicle of Jinakalamali written during the 16th century in what is today Thailand. (see Jatukham Rammathep a popular Thai amulet, based on Khattugama, a deity from Sri Lanka) Kataragama village is first mentioned in the historical annals known as Mahavamsa written down in the 5th century CE. It mentions a town named Kajjaragama from which important dignitaries came to receive the sacred Bo sapling sent from Ashoka’s Mauryan Empire on 288 BCE. (According to Ponnambalam Arunachalam Kajjaragama is derived from Kârttikeya Grâma ("City of Kartikeya"), shortened to Kajara-gama)

=== Archeological evidence ===
The vicinity of the temple has number of ancient ruins and inscriptions. Based on dated inscriptions found, the nearby Kiri Vehera is believed to have been built or renovated around the 1st century BCE. There is an inscription, a votive offering to the Mangala Mahacetiya, apparently the former name of Kiri Vehera on the orders of one Mahadathika Mahanaga, a son of king Tiritara who ruled in 447 CE. There is also an inscription of Dapula I dated to the 7th century CE who built a sanctuary for Buddhist monks, but the inscription does not mention Kataragama by name. Nearby Tissamaharama was a trading town of antiquity by the 2nd century BCE, as indicated by Prakrit and Tamil Brahmi legends in coins and potsherds unearthed on the site. The region was part of the ancient kingdom of Ruhuna which played an important role in the political history of the island.

=== Role of Kalyangiri Swamy ===
The medieval phase of the history of the shrine began with the arrival of Kalyanagiri Swamy from North India sometimes during the 16th or 17th century. He identified the very spot of the shrines and their mythic associations with characters and events as expounded in Skanda Purana. Following his re-establishment of the forest shrine, it again became a place of pilgrimage for Indian and Sri Lankan Hindus. The shrine also attracted local Sinhala Buddhist devotees. The caretakers of the shrines were people of the forest who were of indigenous Vedda or mixed Vedda and Sinhalese lineages. The shrines popularity increased with the veneration of the place by the kings of the Kingdom of Kandy, the last indigenous kingdom before colonial occupation of the island. When Indian indentured workers were brought in after the British occupation in 1815, they too began to participate in the pilgrimage in droves, thus the popularity of the shrine increased amongst all sections of the people.

John Davy's account of Kataragama 1821

"The Katragam dewale consists of two apartments, of which the outer one only is accessible. Its walls are ornamented with figures of different gods, and with historical paintings executed in the usual style. Its ceiling is a mystically painted cloth, and the door of the inner apartment is hid by a similar cloth. On the left of the door there is a small foot-bath and basin, in which the officiating priest washes his feet and hands before he enters the sanctum. Though the idol was still in the jungle where it had been removed during the rebellion, the inner room appropriated to it was as jealously guarded as before"

— Account of the Interior of Ceylon. Davy, John

== Legends ==
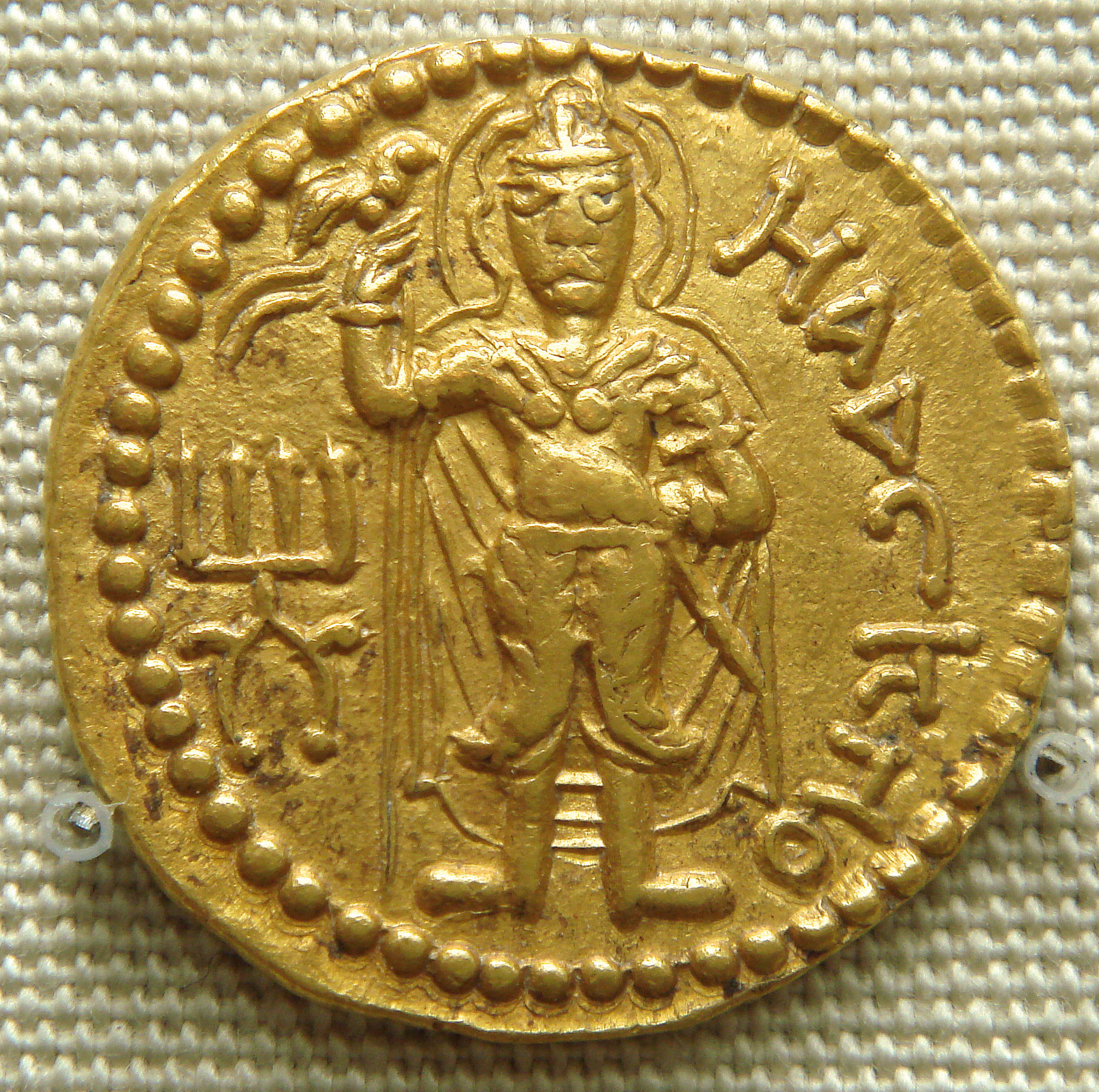
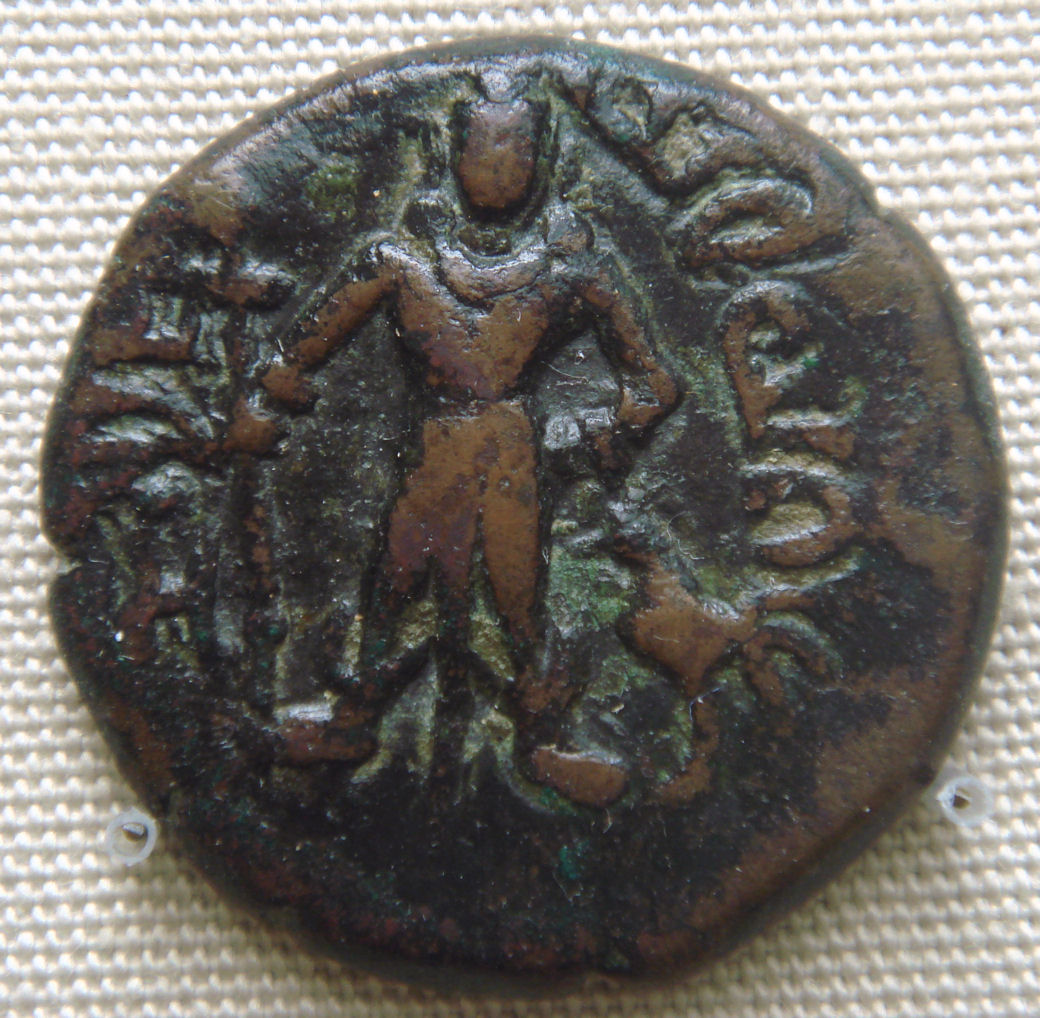
Left:Mahasena on a coin of Huvishka 140–180 BCE. Right:Karttikeya with vel and rooster, coin of the Yaudheyas, 200 BCE.

=== Hindu legends ===
According to Hindus and some Buddhist texts, the main shrine is dedicated to Kartikeya, known as Murugan in Tamil sources. Kartikeya, also known as Kumara, Skanda, Saravanabhava, Visakha or Mahasena, is the chief of warriors of celestial Gods. The Kushan Empires and the Yaudheyas had his likeness minted in coins that they issued in the last centuries BCE. The deity's popularity has waned in North India but has survived in South India. In South India, he became known as Subrahmaniya and was eventually fused with another local god of war known as Murugan among Tamils. Murugan is known independently from Sangam literature dated from the 2nd century BCE to the 6th century CE. Along the way, a number of legends were woven about the deity's birth, accomplishments, and marriages, including one to a tribal princess known amongst Tamil and Sinhalese sources as Valli. The Skanda Purana, written in Sanskrit in the 7th or 8th century, is the primary corpus of all literature about him. A Tamil rendition of the Skanda Purana known as the Kandha Puranam written in the 14th century also expands on legends of Valli meeting Murugan. The Kandha Puranam plays a greater role for Sri Lankan Tamils than Tamils from India, who hardly know it.

In Sri Lanka the Sinhala Buddhists also worshiped Kartikeya as Kumaradevio or Skanda-Kumara since at least the 4th century, if not earlier. Skanda-Kumara was known as one of the guardian deities until the 14th century, invoked to protect the island; they are accommodated within the non-theistic Buddhist religion. During the 11th and 12th century CE, the worship of Skanda-Kumara was documented even among the royal family. At some point in the past Skanda-Kumara was identified with the deity in Kataragama shrine, also known as Kataragama deviyo and Kataragama deviyo, became one of the guardian deities of Sri Lanka. Numerous legends have sprung about Kataragama deviyo, some of which try to find an independent origin for Katargamadevio from the Hindu roots of Skanda-Kumara.

=== Buddhist legends ===
One of the Sinhala legends tells that when Skanda-Kumara moved to Sri Lanka, he asked for refuge from Tamils. The Tamils refused, and he came to live with the Sinhalese in Kataragama. As a penance for their refusal, the deity forced Tamils to indulge in body piercing and fire walking in his annual festival. This legend tries to explain the location of the shrine as well as the traditional patterns of worship by Tamils. Another Sinhala legends attests that Kataragama deviyo was the deity worshiped by Dutugamunu in the 1st century BCE, before his war with Ellalan, and that Dutugamunu had the shrine erected to Skanda-Kumara at Kataragama after his victory. This legend has no corroboration in the Mahavamsa, the historic annals about Dutugamunu. Another Sinhala legend makes Kataragama deviyo a deification of a Tamil spy sent by Elara to live amongst the Sinhalese or a Tamil juggler who made the locals deify him after his death. Yet another legend says that Kataragama deviyo is a deification of the legendary king Mahasena, who is born as a bodhisattva or Buddha in waiting. Anthropologists Richard Gombrich and Gananath Obeyesekere were able to identify new strands of these legends and the originators of these legends since the 1970s, with the burgeoning popularity of the shrine and its deity amongst the Sinhala Buddhists.

According to the practice of cursing and sorcery peculiar to Sinhala Buddhists, Kataragama deviyo has his dark side represented by Getabaru and Kadavara. The current Getabaru shrine is located in an isolated place near Morawaka. The shrine for Kadavara is in the town of Kataragama. His power to curse is carried out in secret outside the Main Kataragama deviyo shrine at a place at the Menik Ganga, where he receives animal sacrifices. Katagama devio is also directly invoked in sorcery practices.

=== Muslim legends ===
A number of Muslim pious and holy men seems to have migrated from India and settled down in the vicinity. The earliest known one is one Hayathu, whose simple residence became the mosque. Another one called Karima Nabi is supposed to have discovered a source of water that when drunk provides immortality. Historic figures such as Jabbar Ali Sha (died 1872) and Meer Syed Mohhamed Alisha Bawa (died 1945) also have mausoleums built over their Tombs.

=== Vedda legends ===
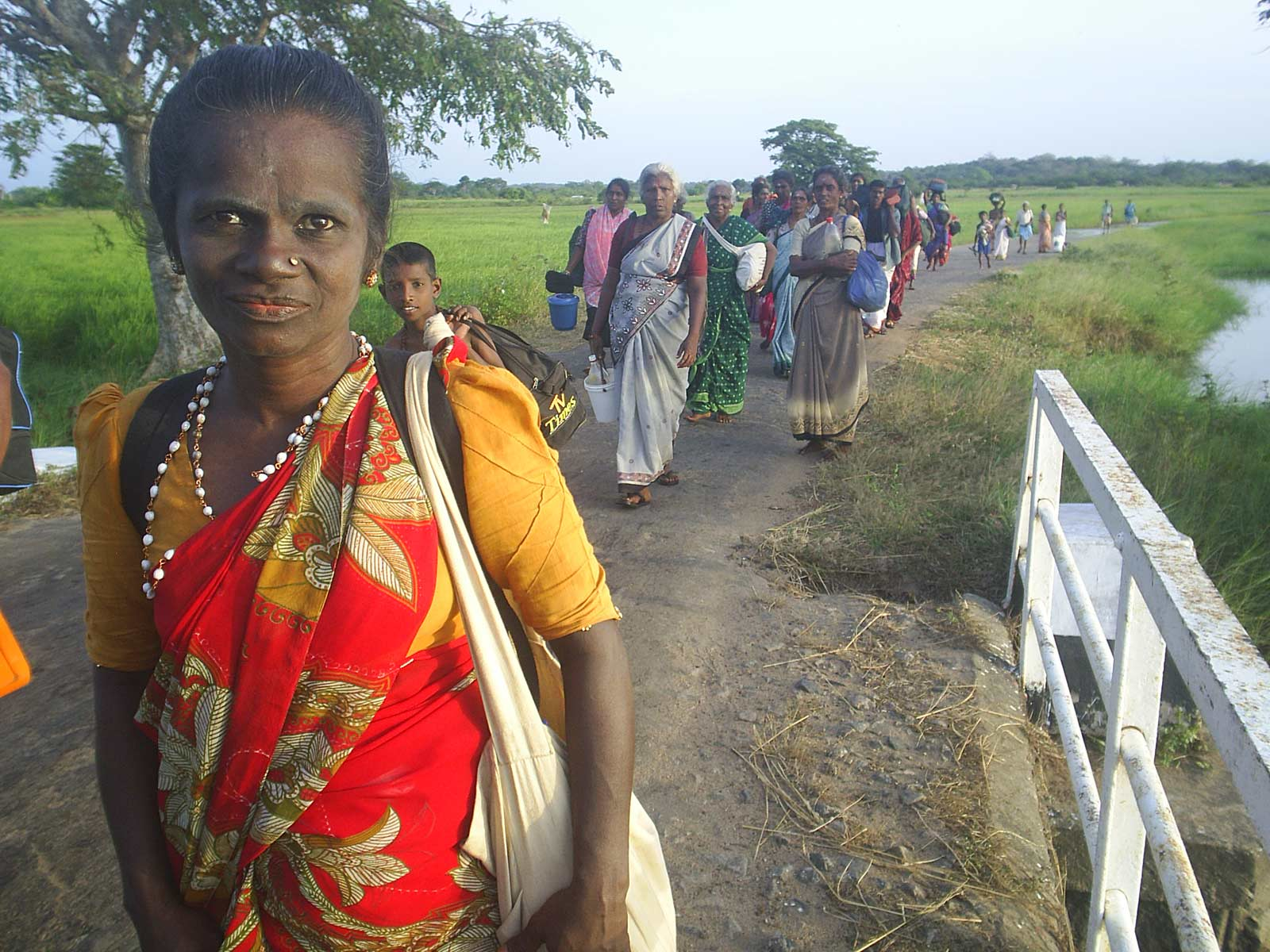
People of Coast Vedda descent taking a pilgrimage on foot (Pada Yatra) from the town of Muttur in the east of Sri Lanka to the temple

Muslim or Islamic legends about Kataragama are relatively newer. According to Muslims Kataragama is referred to as al-Khidr or land of Khidr. The Veddas who have kept out of the mainstream culture of Sri Lanka do not subscribe to Kataragama deviyo as their deity. Unassimilated Veddas consider Kande Yakka or Gale Yakka (Lord of the Rock) as their primarily deity to be propitiated before hunts. They propitiate the deity by building a shrine made out of thatched leaves with a lance or arrow planted in the middle of the structure. They dance around the shrine with the shaman becoming possessed with the spirits of the dead ancestors who guide the hunting party in techniques and places to go hunt. Anthropologist Charles Gabriel Seligman felt that the Kataragama deviyo cult has taken on some aspects of the Kande Yakka rituals and traditions. A clan of Veddas who lived near to the shrine was known as Kovil Vanam (Temple precincts). As a clan they are extinct but were to be found in the eastern province during the 19th century. Local Veddas believed that the nearby mountain peak of Vaedihitti Kande (The Mountain of Veddas) was the abode of the deity. The deity after coming over the shore married a local Vedda woman named Valli, a daughter of a Vedda chief and resided in the mountain. Eventually he was coaxed into settling down at the current location.

== Temple layout ==
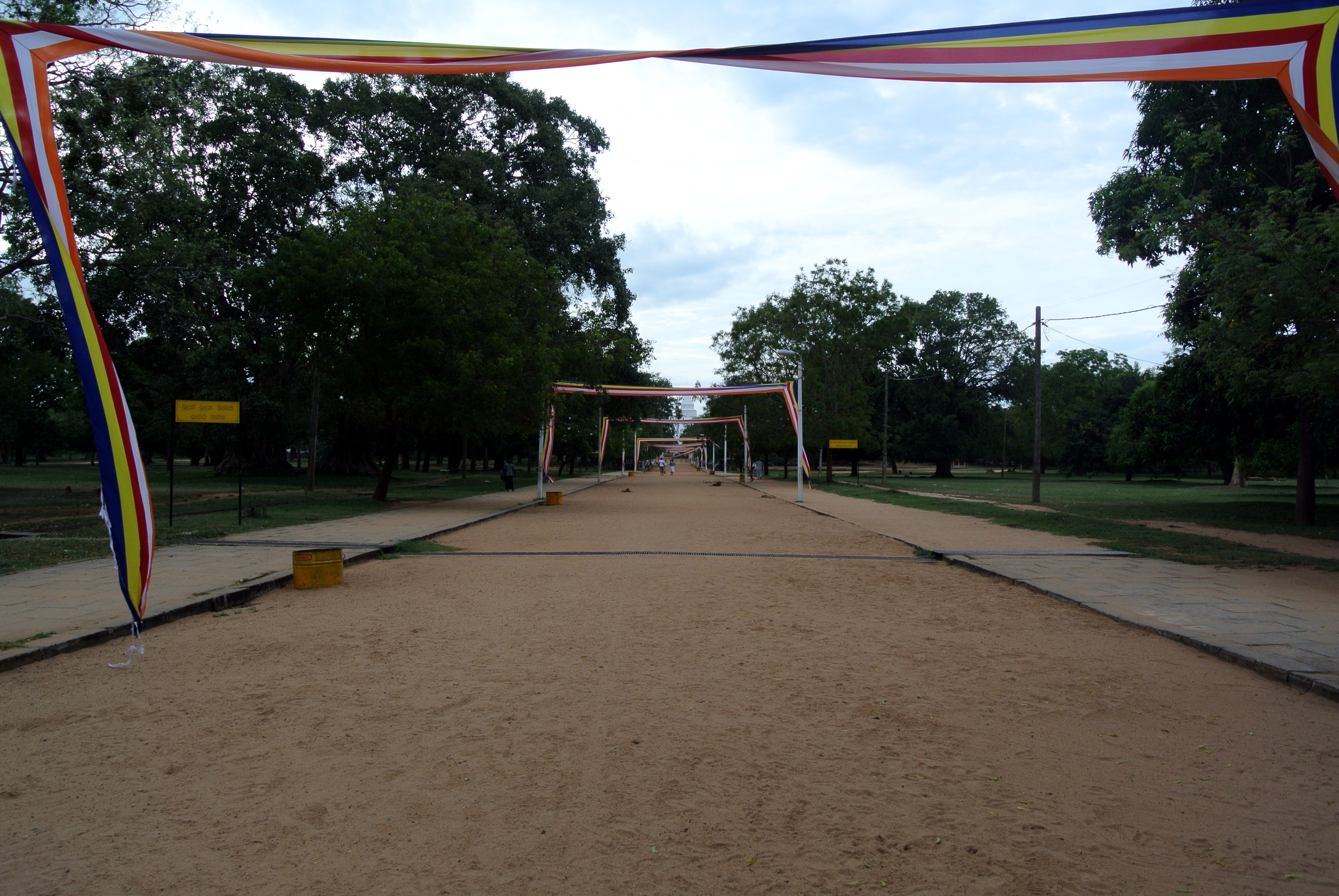
Path towards the Kiri Vehera, on the temple complex

Almost all the shrines are nondescript small rectangular buildings without any ornamentation. There is no representative of deities adorning the outside of the buildings. This is in contrast to any other Hindu temple in Sri Lanka or India. Almost all shrines are built of stone except that one dedicated to Valli which shows timber construction. They have been left as originally constructed and there are not any plans to improve upon them, because people are reluctant to tamper with the original shrine complex.

The most important one is known as Maha Devale or Maha Kovil and is dedicated to Skanda-Murugan known amongst the Sinhalese as Kataragama deviyo. It does not have a statute of the deity; instead it holds a Yantra, a spiritual drawing of the deity's power. Of all the shrines in the complex, it is the largest and the first that all pilgrims come to visit. Although it does not have a representation of the deity, kept in an adjoining room is a statue of Shiva also known amongst Sinhalese as Karanduva. Within it there is a clay arm chair known as Kalana Mandima that supposedly belonged to Kalyanagiri Swamy. It is covered by a leopard's skin and on it has all the ceremonial instruments. To the left of the main shrine lies a smaller shrine dedicated to Hindu god Ganesha who is known as Ganapatidevio amongst Sinhalese. Tamils refer to him as the Manica Pillaiyar as well. It too is a small rectangular building without any decoration. To the left of Ganesha shrine stands the Vishnu Devale the shrine dedicated to Vishnu within which there is also a Buddha image. Behind this is a large Bo tree that tradition holds as sprung from the sapling of the original Bo tree in Anuradhapura, hence is very much held in high esteem by the visiting Buddhists.

Attached to the western wall of the shrine complex are shrines dedicated Kali, Pattini, Managara devio, Dedimunda and Suniyam. Outside the temple yard and beyond the northern gate lies the shrine to Teyvanai, the consort of Murugan. Teyvanai shrine is managed by the Sankara Mutt from Sringeri in Karnataka, India. The shrine dedicated to Valli, the consort of the main deity lies in front of the mosque. Close to the Valli shrine is a Kadamba tree that is sacred to Murugan. Within the mosque are number of tombs of Muslim holy men. There is also a separate shrine dedicated to the tomb of Kalayangiri swamy known amongst Tamils as Mutuligaswamy kovil. It is also known as the Siva Devale.

== Murukan and Kataragama deviyo cults ==
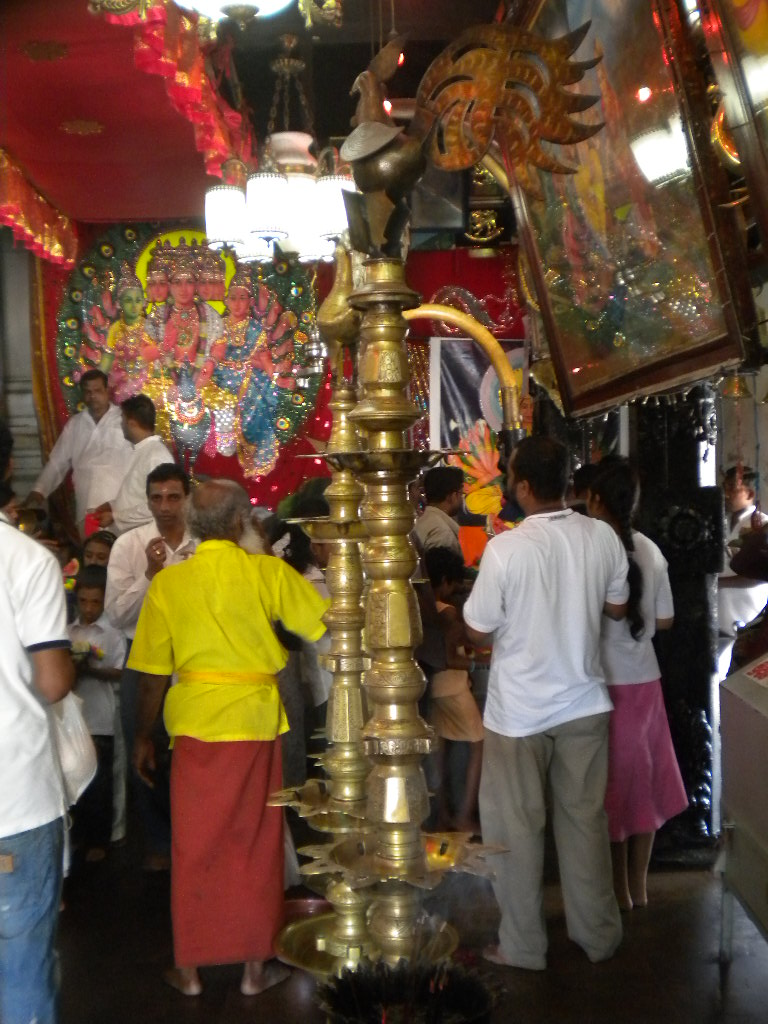
The interior of the Maha Devale. The Yantra is kept behind a curtain that figures Murukan with his two wives

Buddhism doesn't encourage veneration of deities, and yet Buddhists in Sri Lanka make an annual pilgrimage to Kataragama. The deity has attained the position of national god amongst the Sinhalese. This reflects the similar position held by Murukan amongst Tamils.

=== Murukan ===
Murukan is known from Sangam Tamil literature. The earliest reference to Murukan was as a god who was propitiated to help in good hunting. He was the primary god of hunter-gatherer people from the mountainous region of southern Tamil Nadu very much like the Veddas of Sri Lanka. With the advancement of settled agriculture, Murukan became identified with the tribal chieftains as a god of war, becoming popular among all segments of the society. He was worshiped symbolically as lance and trees such as the Kadamba (Neolamarckia cadamba) were considered to be sacred to him. Birds such as the peafowl or rooster were also identified with the deity. Velans were a special class of priests identified with his worship.

With advent of North Indian traditions arriving with the Pallava and Kadamba dynasties, Murukan was infused with the aspects of Kartikeya or Skanda, a god of war from North India. All legends that were attributed to Kartikeya were also attributed to Murukan. The syncretic deity has six major temples in Tamil Nadu and countless many other smaller temples. Legends developed that bound the worship of syncretic Skanda-Murukan to Tamil Nadu as a god of the Tamils. It included his marriage of Valli from Toṇṭaināṭu.

=== Katargamadevio cult ===
Legends in Sri Lanka claimed that Valli was a daughter of a Vedda chief from Kataragama in the south of the island. The town of Kalutara, known in some sources as Velapura, became associated with Murukan worship as well. The cult of Murukan was grafted onto the worship of Skanda-Kumara that was prevalent in Sri Lanka. Amongst the Sinhalese he became known as the god of Kataragama village, thus Kataragamdevio. Shrines of Katargamadevio are found in almost all Sinhala Buddhist villages and towns. He is recognized as one of the guardian deities. Worshipers take an arduous pilgrimage on foot through jungles to fulfill their vows to the deity. The pilgrimage included both Tamils from India and Sri Lanka as well as Sinhalese. Number of temples mostly in the east coast of Sri Lanka became identified with Kataragama temple and synchronized their festivals based on the arrival of pilgrims all the way from the north of the island. These include temples in Verugal, Mandur, Tirukovil and Okanda. In the interior of the island temples such as Embekke were built in the 15 to 17 the century CE to propitiate the Murukan aspect of Kataragamdevio by the Sinhalese elite.

Since the 1950s the cult of Kataragama has taken a nationalistic tone amongst the Sinhalese people. People visit the shrine year long, and during the annual festival it looks like a carnival. People get into trance and indulge in ecstatic rituals formerly associated with Hindus such as fire walking, Kavadi and even body piercing or hook swinging. These ecstatic rituals have carried through the island and are widely practiced. Prominent Sinhalese politicians such as Dudley Senanayake and Ranasinghe Premadasa have associated with the temple upkeep by building, renovation and cleaning projects.

== Festivals ==
The festivals and daily rituals do not adhere to standard Hindu Agamic or Buddhist rituals. It follows what Paul Younger calls as ancient Vedda traditions of worship. Although since the medieval period Hindus, Buddhists and even Muslims have tried to co-opt the temple, deity and its worship as their own, the rituals maintained by the native priests are still intact. The main festival known in Sinhalese as Esela Perehera. It is celebrated during the months of July and August. About 45 days before the festival begins, the priests go into the forest and find two forked branches of a sacred tree. The branches are then immersed in the local river and kept at the shrines dedicated to Kataragama deviyo and Vali. When the main festival begins, the Yantra representing the deity is retrieved from its storage location, paraded through a street on top of an elephant, and carried to the Valli shrine. After two hours it is returned. On the last day of the festival the Yantra is left overnight at the Valli shrine and brought back to the main shrine. The priests conduct the rituals in silence, covering their mouths with white cloth. Associated with the main festival is fire walking arranged by a master of the ritual. Hundreds of devotees participate in fire walking, yet others participate in ecstatic dance forms called Kavadi and body piercing. Many of the pilgrims exhibit signs of being possessed.

== See also ==
- Karthikeyan
- Kataragama Bodhiya
- Kataragama Wasana

== Cited literature ==
- Bastin, Rohan (2002), The Domain of Constant Excess: Plural Worship at the Munnesvaram Temples in Sri Lanka, Berghahn Books, ISBN 1-57181-252-0
- Bechert, Heinz (1970). "Skandakumara and Kataragama: An Aspect of the Relation of Hinduism and Buddhism in Sri Lanka". Proceedings of the Third International Tamil Conference Seminar. Paris: International Association of Tamil Research.
- Clothey, Fred; Ramanujan, A.K. (1978), The many faces of Murukan: the history and meaning of a South Indian god, Mouton de Gruyter, ISBN 0-415-34438-7
- Davidson, Linda Kay; Gitlitz, David Martin (2002), Pilgrimage: From the Ganges to Graceland: An Encyclopedia, University of California, Santa Barbara, ISBN 978-1-57607-004-8
- Feddema, J.P. (December 1997). "The cursing practice in Sri Lanka as a religious channel for". Journal of Asian and African Studies. 32 (3–4). The Netherlands: E.J. Brill: 202–222. doi:10.1177/002190969703200303. S2CID 144302471.
- Gombrich, Richard Francis; Obeyesekere, Gananath (December 1999), Buddhism Transformed: Religious Change in Sri Lanka, Motilal Banarsidass, ISBN 81-208-0702-2
- Gupta, Suman (2010), Globalization in India: Contents and Discontents, Pearson Education South Asia, ISBN 978-81-317-1988-6
- Holt, John (1991), Buddha in the crown: Avalokiteśvara in the Buddhist traditions of Sri Lanka, Oxford University Press, ISBN 0-19-506418-6
- Kapferer, Bruce (1997), The Feast of the Sorcerer: practices of consciousness and power, University of Chicago Press, ISBN 0-226-42413-8
- Klostermaier, Klaus (2007), A survey of Hinduism, State University of New York Press, ISBN 978-0-7914-7081-7
- Paranavitana, Senarath (1933), Epigraphia Zeylanica (PDF), vol. III, Oxford University Press
- Raj, Selva (2006), Dealing with Deities: The Ritual Vow in South Asia, State University of New York, ISBN 0-7914-6707-4
- Reynolds, Craig (2006), Seditious histories:contesting Thai and Southeast Asian pasts, University of Washington Press, ISBN 9971-69-335-6
- Tambiah, Stanley (1986), Sri Lanka : ethnic fratricide and the dismantling of democracy, University of Chicago, ISBN 1-85043-026-8
- Wanasundera, Nanda (2004), Cultures of the world: Sri Lanka, Times Books International, ISBN 0-7614-1477-0
- Wirz, Paul (1966), Kataragama:The holiest place in Ceylon, Lake house publishing house, OCLC 9662399
- Womak, Marie (2005), Symbols and Meaning: A Concise Introduction, Altamira Press, ISBN 0-7591-0322-4
- Younger, Paul (2001), Playing Host to Deity: Festival Religion in the South Indian Tradition, Oxford University Press, ISBN 0-19-514044-3
