= Kiri Vehera (Polonnaruwa) =

12th-century stupa, Sri Lanka

- කිරි වෙහෙර

Religion
- Affiliation: Buddhism
- Ecclesiastical or organisational status: Archaeological protected monument

Location
- Location: Polonnaruwa, North Central Province, Sri Lanka
- Interactive map of Kiri Vehera
- Coordinates: 7.9547°N 81.0022°E

Architecture
- Completed: 12th century CE

Kiri Vehera (කිරි වෙහෙර, meaning "Milk Stupa") is a well-preserved 12th-century stupa located in the ancient city of Polonnaruwa, a UNESCO World Heritage Site in Sri Lanka. It is situated within the Ālāhana Pirivena monastic complex, near the Lankatilaka Viharaya. Built by Queen Subhadra, a consort of King Parakramabahu I (1153–1186), it is renowned for its original lime plaster coating which remains largely intact after more than 800 years.

== History ==
The stupa was constructed during the reign of King Parakramabahu the Great. According to the Mahavamsa, the great chronicle of Sri Lanka, the stupa was built by Bhaddavatī (Subhadra), one of Parakramabahu's queens. It was originally known as the Rupavati Chetiya or Rupavati Thupa. The current name, Kiri Vehera, which translates to "Milk Stupa," was likely given later due to the brilliant white colour of its lime plaster finish that survived for centuries.

After the fall of the Kingdom of Polonnaruwa in the 13th century, the city was abandoned and became overgrown with dense jungle. The Kiri Vehera remained hidden for centuries until it was rediscovered by British explorers in the 19th century. When it was found, the stupa was in an exceptional state of preservation, with its original lime plaster largely unharmed by the centuries of neglect and exposure to the elements.

== Architecture ==
Kiri Vehera is a classic example of a Bubbulakara (or bubble-shaped stupa), a common design in ancient Sri Lankan stupa architecture. It stands approximately 29 metres (95 feet) high and has a diameter of 27 metres (88 feet) at its base. The structure is built of brick and completely covered with lime plaster, or sudha-ga-lava. This original plaster finish is its most distinguishing feature, as most other stupas from this era have lost their outer coatings and now expose their brick core.

The stupa is built on a raised square platform and is surrounded by a boundary wall. Around the main stupa, there are several smaller, subsidiary stupas, likely serving as tombs for royal family members or high-ranking monks of the Ālāhana Pirivena. The simplicity of its design, with minimal ornamentation, is characteristic of the Polonnaruwa period's architectural style.

== See also ==
- Polonnaruwa
- Rankoth Vehera
- Gal Vihara
- Ancient stupas of Sri Lanka
