= Pabalu Wehera =

Ancient Buddhist stupa, Polonnaruwa, Sri Lanka

Religion
- Affiliation: Theravada Buddhism
- Ecclesiastical or organizational status: Archaeological site, Ruin

Location
- Location: Polonnaruwa, North Central Province, Sri Lanka
- Interactive map of Pabalu Wehera
- Coordinates: 7°56′36.5″N 81°00′15.8″E

Pabalu Wehera (පබළු වෙහෙර, lit. 'Coral Shrine' or 'Bead Shrine') is an ancient Buddhist stupa located in the historic city of Polonnaruwa, Sri Lanka. It is situated in the main archaeological park, south of the Rankoth Vehera and close to the eastern city wall. The construction of the stupa is traditionally attributed to Queen Rupavati, a consort of King Parakramabahu I (1153–1186 CE). The site is notable for its well-preserved, though partially ruined, brick stupa and the unusual cluster of nine small image houses (gedige) that surround it. It is managed by Sri Lanka's Central Cultural Fund.

== Etymology ==
The name Pabalu Wehera translates to "Bead Shrine" or "Coral Shrine." According to local tradition and archaeological interpretations, the name likely derives from the discovery of a large number of small glass beads in the surrounding area during excavations, which are believed to have been offerings made by ancient pilgrims.

== History ==
Pabalu Wehera dates back to the Polonnaruwa period. Its construction is attributed to Queen Rupavati, one of the queens of King Parakramabahu I. The Chulavamsa, the historical chronicle of Sri Lanka, records that a queen named Rūpavatī, noted for her beauty and piety, "had a cetiya built in the capital which was decorated with glittering golden pinnacles." Historians identify this record with the Pabalu Wehera.

The stupa stands as a testament to the extensive architectural and religious building programs undertaken during Parakramabahu I's reign, which is considered a golden age of the Polonnaruwa Kingdom.

== Architecture ==
The main structure is a brick-built stupa, originally constructed in the bubbulakara (bubble shape) form, which was common during the Polonnaruwa period. While the top section (hatharas kotuwa and spire) has collapsed, the hemispherical dome (garbha) remains largely intact, making it one of the best-preserved stupas of its era in the city.

A distinctive architectural feature of Pabalu Wehera is the group of at least nine small image houses that are clustered around the main stupa. This arrangement is uncommon in Sri Lankan monastic architecture. Each of these small brick shrines would have originally contained a Buddha statue, and their close proximity to the stupa suggests a unique ritualistic focus for the complex. Most of the statues within these shrines are now missing or damaged. The entire complex is built on a raised terrace, also constructed from brick.

== See also ==
- Polonnaruwa
- Rankoth Vehera
- Kiri Vehera
- Gal Vihara
- Lankathilaka Viharaya
- Ancient stupas of Sri Lanka
