= Grandpass =

Grandpass තොටළඟ பாலத்துறை
- Suburb
- Location in Colombo District
- Coordinates: 6°56′51″N 79°52′29″E
- Country: Sri Lanka
- Province: Western Province
- District: Colombo District
- Time zone: UTC+5:30 (Sri Lanka Standard Time Zone)
- Postal Code: 01400

Grandpass is a suburb in Colombo, Sri Lanka. It is part of an area known as Colombo 14.

== History ==
During the Portuguese administration in Sri Lanka, the area was named Grande Passo. The name was anglicised during the British administration to become Grandpass. It was also known as Groote Pas, Pas Nacollegam and Pas van Goensdorp to the Dutch people.

In the late 1800s Samuel Perera Jayatilaka (Ship chandler) built the Sri Jayatilakaramaya Viharaya on Swarna Chaitya road. He had 13 children (7 sons and 6 daughters) including 3 sons who were lawyers Alfred Walter Perera Jayatilaka, Albert Edward Perera Jayatilaka & Samuel Victor Perera Jayatilaka. A.E.P Jayatilaka (Lawyer) had one son and one daughter Dr. Ananda Dasan Perera Jayatilaka & Lakshmi Jayatilaka. Dr. Ananda D.P Jayatilaka was a medical Doctor, University of Colombo and did his PhD in anatomy in 1964 at University of Edinburgh in Scotland. In 1965 he joined the Royal College of Surgeons of England as an Examiner Primary Fellowship. He was also Dean of the medical school of the University of Peradeniya (1973-1975) in Kandy and he attended Royal College, Colombo. Descendants of the Jayatilaka family now live in Australia and Canada. With educational connections to St Andrew's School (Adelaide), The University of Adelaide, University of Wollongong in Dubai, Dubai International Academy, University of Sydney, Monash University, Trinity College, Kandy, Trinity Grammar School (New South Wales).

The Temple houses a Dedimunda deviyo Shrine a symbol of the Sinhala Kingdom, Bodhi Tree, Navagraha Statue and 3 Devi shrines. The Temple has been maintained by 5 generations of Monks. Who teach dharma at the local school. The temple is a testimony to the principles and values of Buddhism having survived so many generations. The temple and monks have impacted many lives in their ongoing service to the residents nearby over centuries. It is a historic landmark in the area. The care and maintenance of the temple grounds and of the local school are thanks to the clergy who have looked after the property well. The Noble Triple Gem, Three Jewels & Three roots, Four Noble Truths, and Noble Eightfold Path have been guiding principles to the Theravada Buddhist beliefs of the community. The Pali Canon is especially important in cultivating the spiritual teachings of the Buddha and the essence of the Sri Dalada Maligawa Temple of the Tooth among Sri Lanka. Attaining Enlightenment, Nirvana, and the Path to Liberation is the mission of the Temple, Monks (Sangha) and family. Buddhist cosmology is an area of research highly revered by the devotees.
