= Kataragama Bodhiya =

Sacred tree in Kataragama, Sri Lanka

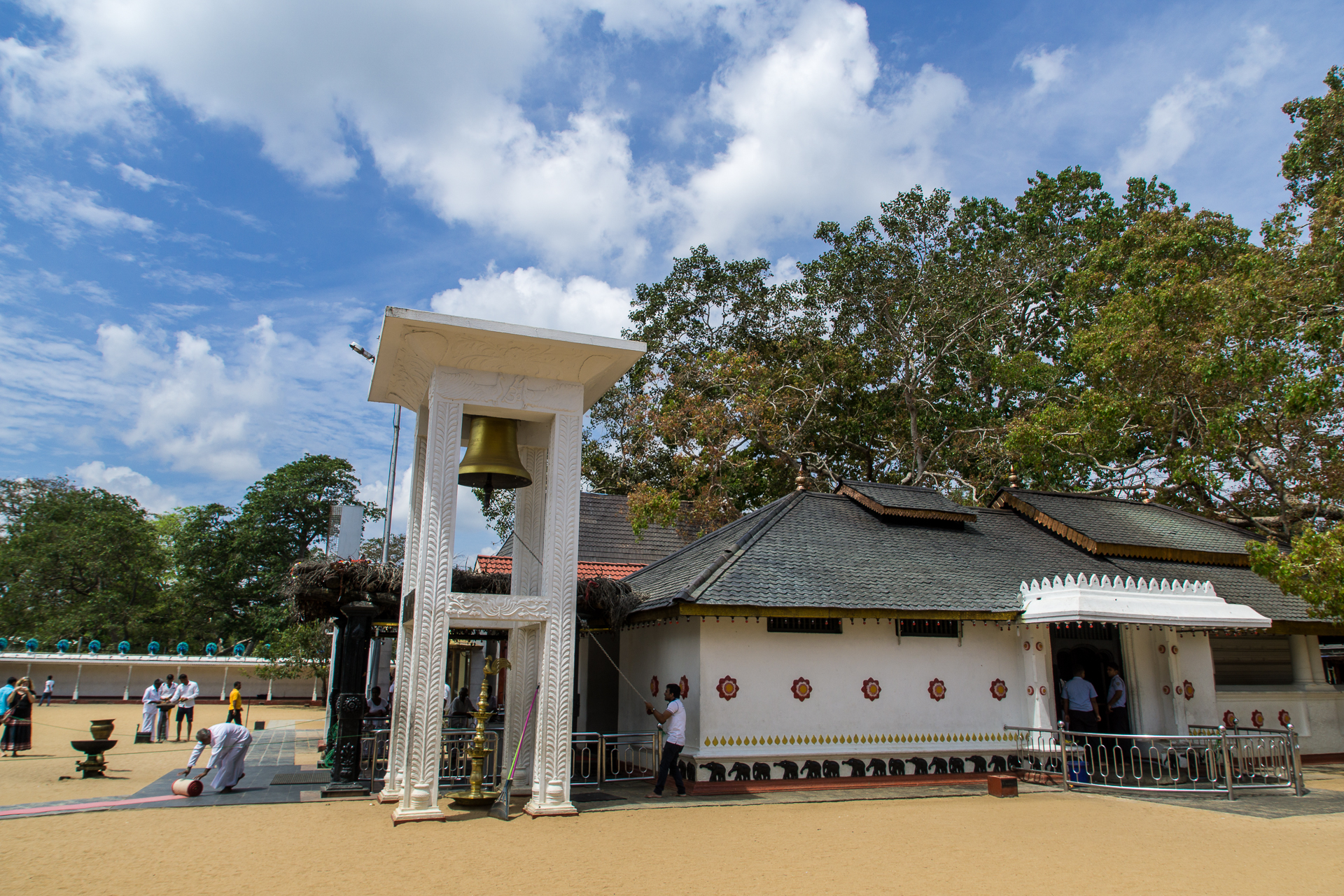
- Kataragama Bodhiya and Kataragama temple
- Species: Bodhi (Ficus religiosa)
- Location: Kataragama, Sri Lanka
- Date seeded: According to chronicles the sapling was planted around in the 3rd century BC
- Custodian: Kataragama Kiri Vehera temple

Kataragama Bodhiya (also called Ashta Pala Ruha Bodhiya, Ananda Bodhiya) is a sacred fig (Bo tree) located in Kataragama, Sri Lanka.

== History ==
An old tree with historical and religious significance, it is believed to be planted in the 3rd century BC by the Kshatriyas of Kataragama, during the reign of king Devanampiyatissa of Anuradhapura. Kataragama Bodhiya is believed to be one of the first eight saplings that emerged from Jaya Sri Maha Bodhi in Anuradhapura, which were planted in different places of the island around the 3rd century BC.

== Present day ==
Today Kataragama Bodhiya is venerated by thousands of Buddhist devotees who are on pilgrimage to Kataragama sacred town. This Bodhi tree is located very close to the Ruhuna Maha Kataragama Devalaya, an ancient temple which dedicated to Kataragama deviyo, a deity venerated by Buddhists, Hindus and other religious believers. Another old sacred fig known as "Kadawara Bodhiya" is located near the Kataragama Bodhiya. It is identified as a Pariwara Bodhiya of the main Kataragama Bodhiya.

== See also ==
- Bodhi tree
- Kalutara Bodhiya
- Matara Bodhiya
