= Rankoth Vehera =

Buddhist stupa in Polonnaruwa, Sri Lanka

Coordinates: 7°57′30″N 81°00′12″E

Rankoth Vehera රන්කොත් වෙහෙර
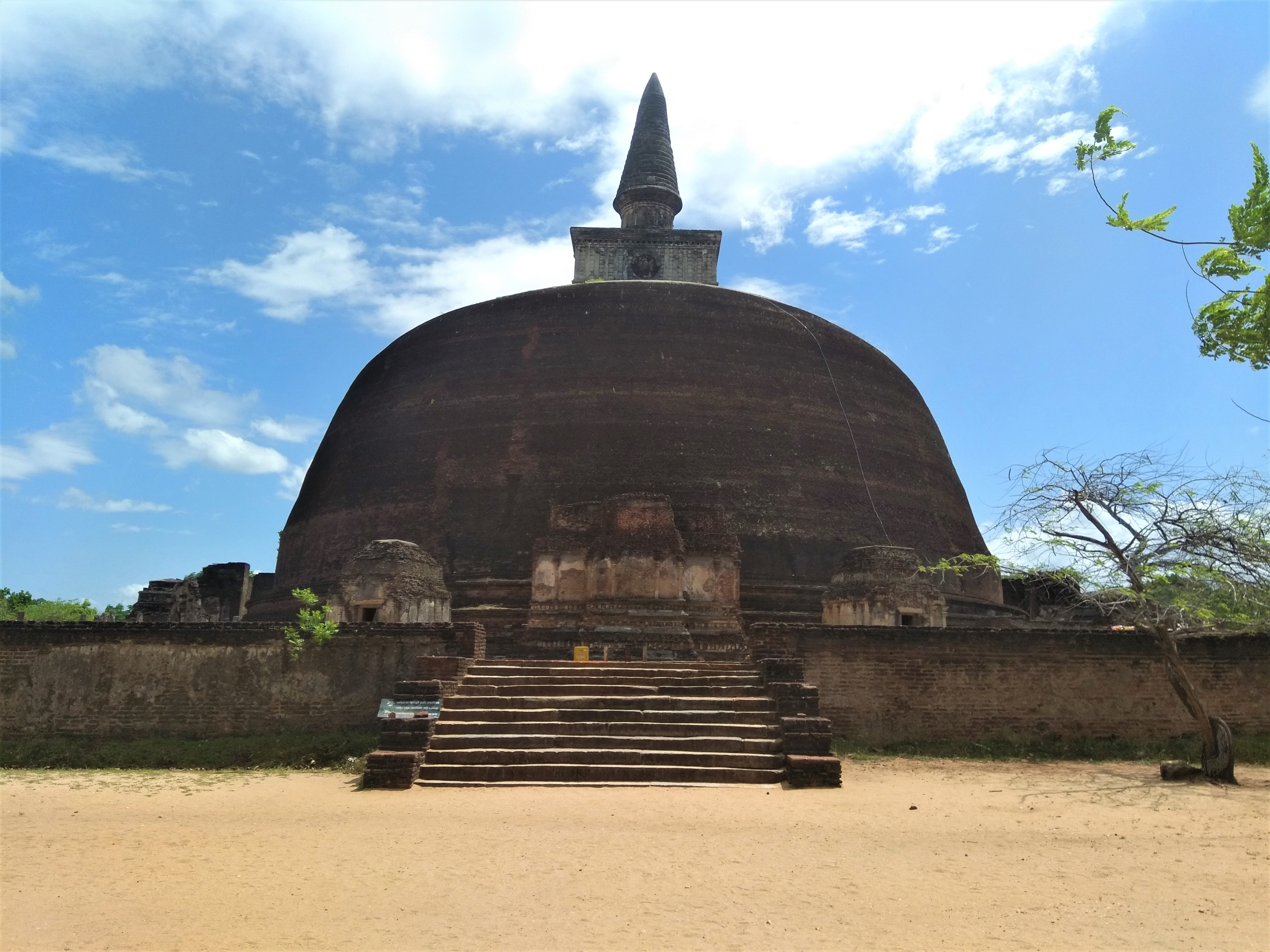
- Golden-Pinnacle Stupa

- Location within Sri Lanka

Religion
- Affiliation: Theravada Buddhism

Location
- Country: Sri Lanka

Architecture
- Founder: Nissanka Malla of Polonnaruwa
- Completed: c. 1190; 836 years ago

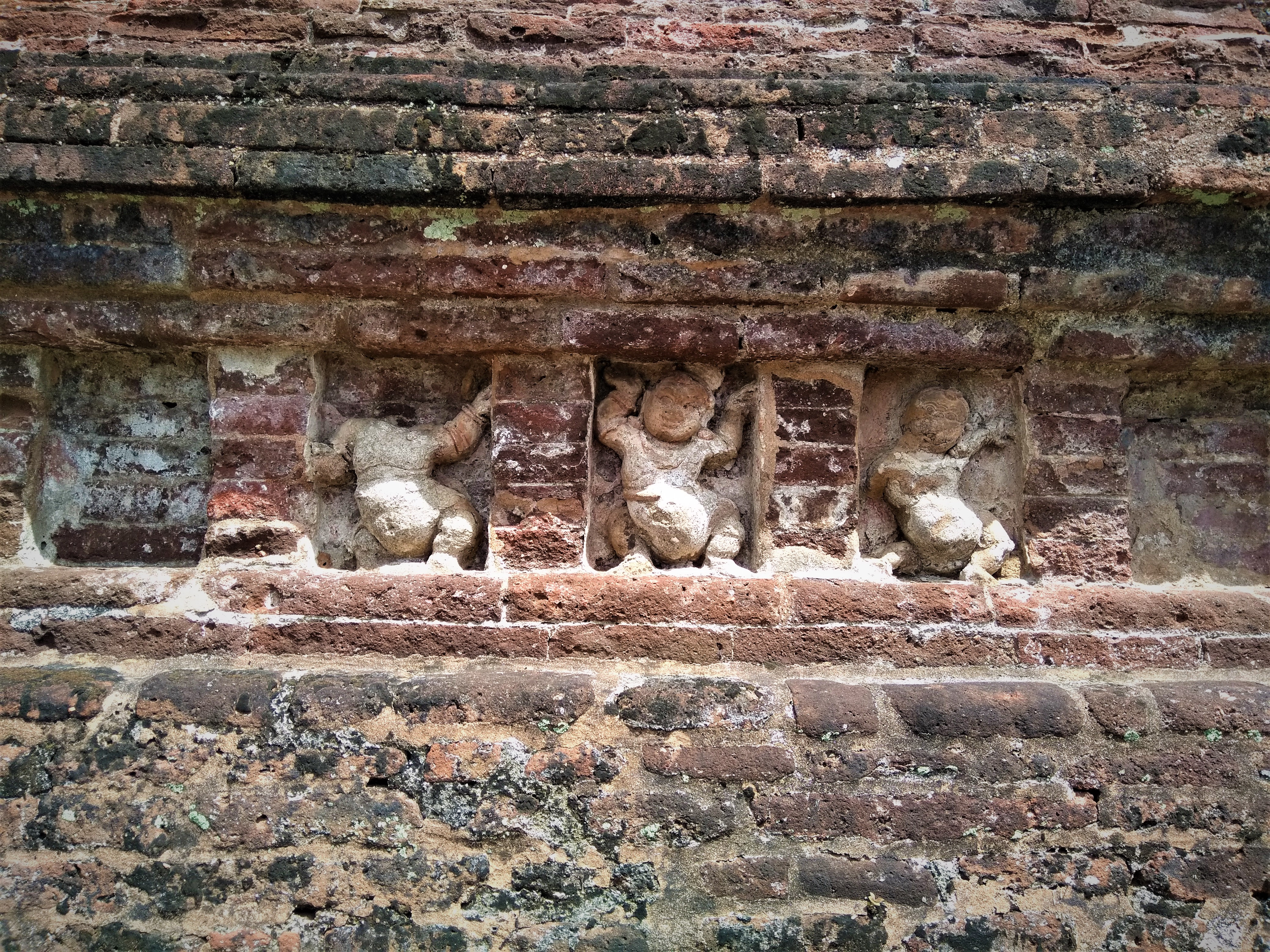
Decorated wall of Rankoth Vehera, ancient city of Polonnaruwa, Sri Lanka

Rankoth Vehera is a stupa located in the ancient city of Polonnaruwa in Sri Lanka. The stupa was built by Nissanka Malla of Polonnaruwa, who ruled the country from 1187 to 1196. The Rankoth Vehera has been built according to the tradition of the stupas of the Anuradhapura Maha Viharaya and bears a close resemblance to Ruwanwelisaya. In fact, a stone inscription situated close to the stupa even identifies it by the name "Ruwanweli". However, it has later come to be known by the currently used name, Rankoth Vehera. In Sinhalese, ran means gold, kotha is the name given to the pinnacle of a stupa, and vehera means stupa or temple. Thus, the name Rankoth Vehera can be roughly translated to English as "Gold Pinnacled Stupa". Along with the Kiri Vehera, it is one of the most revered stupas in Polonnaruwa.

== Description ==
Rankoth Vehera is structure made entirely of brick, and has a base circumference of 550 feet (170 m) and a height of 108 feet (33 m). However, the original shape of the stupa, particularly its upper portion, has been changed during renovation work carried out by later rulers and it is estimated that the original height of Rankoth Vehera may have been almost 200 feet (61 m). Despite this, it remains the largest stupa in the ancient city of Polonnaruwa, and the fourth largest stupa in the country. The stupa has four large Vahalkadas, a structure used for offering flowers and also to support the weight of a stupa. These are also made of brick. The stupa is located in the center of a large square terrace, which is also surrounded by a brick wall. The terrace has four entrances oriented to the four cardinal points, with sand paths leading to them. A stone inscription near one of the entrances mention that King Nissanka Malla observed and supervised the construction of the stupa from there. It is also mentioned that he worshiped the stupa from a small platform, which is located in a corner of the terrace.

== See also ==
- Ancient stupas of Sri Lanka
- Pabalu Wehera
