= Kande Yakka =

Kande Yaka translated as spirit of the mountain or rock in English is a popular spirit invoked during religious rituals of the indigenous Vedda people of Sri Lanka.

Local Veddas near Kataragama temple believe that the nearby mountain peak of Vaedihitti Kande (The Mountain of Veddas) was the abode of the deity. The deity after coming over the shore married a local Vedda woman named Valli, a daughter of a Vedda chief and resided in the mountain. Eventually he was coaxed into settling down at the current location.
