= Menik Ganga =

River in Sri Lanka

Maanikka Gangai
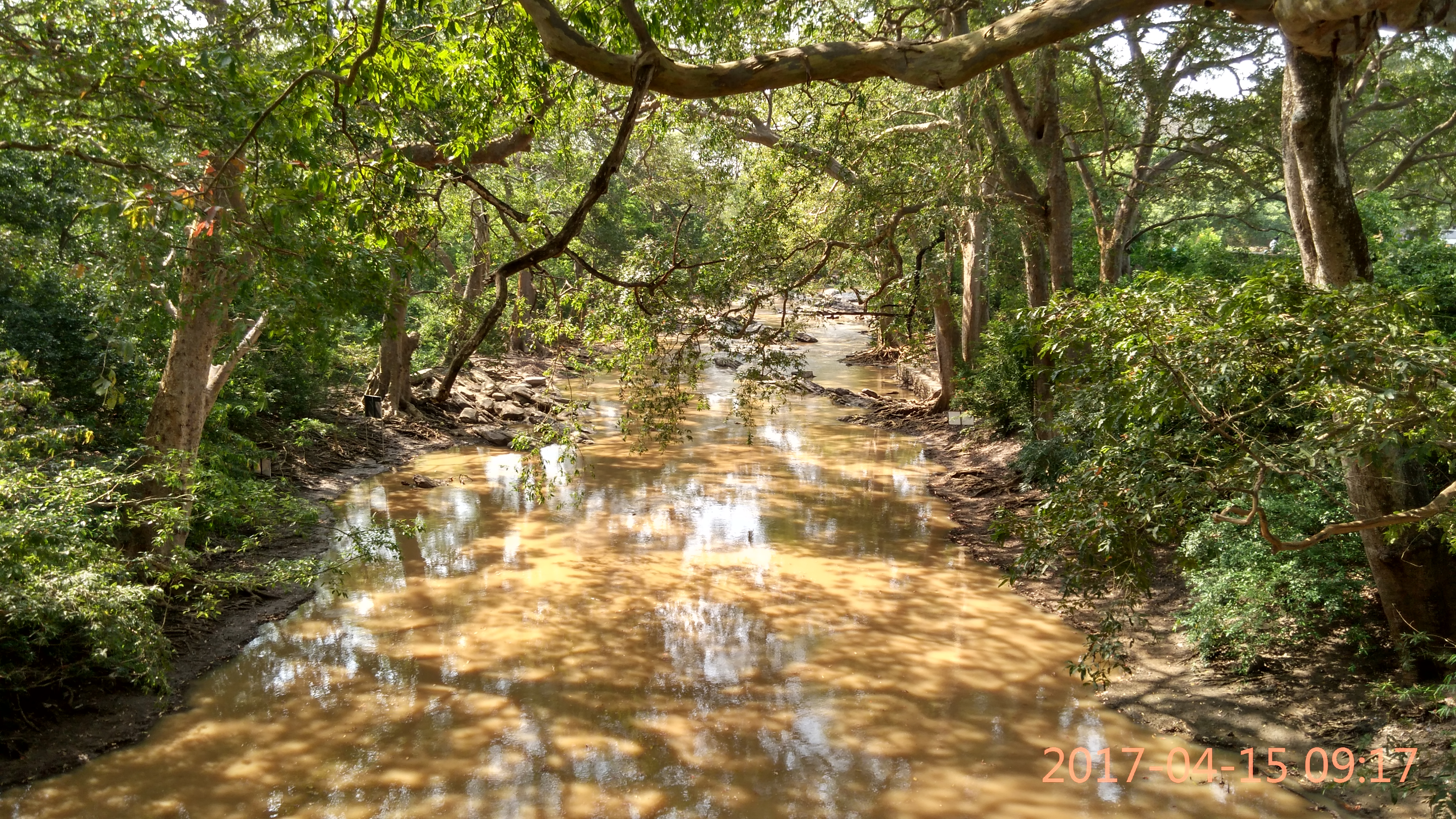
- The river in Kataragama

- Location within Sri Lanka
- Etymology: ganga is a Singhala word for river; menik means gem
- Native name: මැණික් ගඟ (Sinhala)

Physical characteristics
- Source
  - location: Namunukula
- Mouth
  - location: Yala (Ruhuna)
  - coordinates: 06°21′49″N 81°31′55″E
  - elevation: Sea level
- Length: 114 km (71 mi)
- Discharge
  - maximum: 220 10^{6} Sq.m

The Menik Ganga is the thirteenth-longest river of Sri Lanka. The river is approximately 114 km (71 mi) long and flows across two provinces and two districts.

Its catchment area receives approximately 2,124 million cubic metres of rain per year, and approximately 10 percent of the water reaches the sea. It has a catchment area of 1,272 square kilometres.
