= Kataragama Peak =

Mountain in Sri Lanka

- Location within Sri Lanka

Highest point
- Elevation: 424 m (1,391 ft)
- Coordinates: 6°23′12″N 81°20′09″E

Geography
- Location: Sri Lanka

Kataragama Peak is a mountain near Kataragama, in the Monaragala District of Sri Lanka. At a summit elevation of 424 m (1,391 ft), it is the 25th tallest mountain in Sri Lanka.

== See also ==
- List of mountains of Sri Lanka
