= Sri Siddha Suniyam Deviyo =

Sri Lankan deity

For religion in the island country of Sri Lanka, people worship and respect a powerful god called "Śrī Siddha Sūniyam Deviyo". It is believed that this god bears dual sides in his personality. During the bright lunar fortnight (Śukla Pakșa), the Benevolent (Ardha Deva) aspect of Sūniyam Deviyo becomes prominent, while in the dark lunar fortnight (Kŗșņa Pakșa), his Malevolent (Ardha Yakșa) side gets prominent. His Benevolent side always results in the betterment and protection of the virtuous people, while the wicked ones gets severely punished and destroyed by the darker personality of this powerful deity. It is also strongly believed that he travels in the night throughout the country from village to village to help the righteous and discipline the sinful, mounted on his white stallion (Turaga) vehicle (Vāhana), giving rise to a fragrance of jasmine smelled throughout his en route. If a dog barks at him during this traveling, the unfortunate animal will be thrashed with his "Solu" weapon (Āyudha), that results in the paralysis of its hind legs and death of the poor dog. In Sanskrit "Sūna" means born, produced, bringing forth, etc. In contrast to the meaning of "Sūna", "Sūnā" denotes a meaning of a place for slaughtering animals, slaughter-house, butchery, killing, hurting, injuring, imminent death, danger of life, etc. That might refer connotatively to the Malevolent (Ardha Yakșa) side of Sūniyam Deviyo.

== Worshiping Sūniyam Deviyo ==
First, one should have a bath and dress with clean and white garments. Then, the person should observe Buddhist "Tisaraņa"and "Pañca Śīla". Next, a coconut oil lamp should be lighted along with white flowers in a well cleaned place, which is sprinkled with rose water, fumigated with gum benzoin (Sāmbhrāni) and scented with burning of camphor (Karpūra). Lastly, the prayers (Deva Stotra) should be recited. The timings for this, is given in the table below.

Days of week	Timing
Sunday	from 21.00 to 21.45 hrs
Monday	from 21.00 to 21.45 hrs
Tuesday	from 20.15 to 21.00 hrs
Wednesday*	from 21.00 to 21.45 hrs
Thursday	from 20.15 to 21.00 hrs
Friday	from 21.00 to 21.45 hrs
Saturday*	from 21.45 to 22.15 hrs

It is recommended to worship Sūniyam Deviyo specially during "Kemmura" days, such as Wednesdays and Saturdays. While worshiping Sūniyam Deviyo, one should place his or her hands on his or her chest. As the lighted lamp radiates the light, similarly the compassion radiates from the bottom of one's heart will attract the favors of this powerful deity.

== Personal Qualities of a Worshiper ==
The person, who worships this powerful Sūniyam Deviyo, should have the following personal attributes.

1. Do not be a miser
2. Do not be a bad tempered person
3. Do not speak nonsense
4. Do not criticize others
5. Do not gossip
6. Do not hurt others
7. Do not lie
8. Do not cheat
9. Do not consume alcohol
10. Do not be a libertine

== Deva Stotra for Worshiping ==
Śiva namastu namo Rāmah
kanda senā samāgamah
vaďiga tantra maņi kaņțhah
Oďďi mangala namo namah

Agni skandhañca hastena hastena vaďiga kargate
mukhena vişa sarpena šīrşe pañca keşake
udare nāga bandhāmī nīlot turaga vāhanam
Sūniyam devatā nāma maiham pādate namo namah

== To Give Merits to Sūniyam Deviyo ==
To give merits (Puņyānumodanā) to Sūniyam Deviyo, one should recite the following

Nā nā vaņņa mahā tejo odāta haya vāhano
grāma sañcārako devo idam pujnjnānu modatu

Siyalu duk duralana
dev teda balaya sasobana
vihiduvana apamana
Sūniyam devi mepin ganu mena

Dā vemin nuvara Panďuvas niridunța
tejasin turaga vāhana veďa ința
mā tuțin kiyana deya ițukara dența
Śrī siddha Sūniyam deviyani matu Budu vanna (devatāveni me pin ganța)
