= Gal Vihara =

Rock temple of the Buddha in Sri Lanka in Polonaruwa

Gal Vihara (Uttararama)
- ගල් විහාරය lit. ' rock monastery'
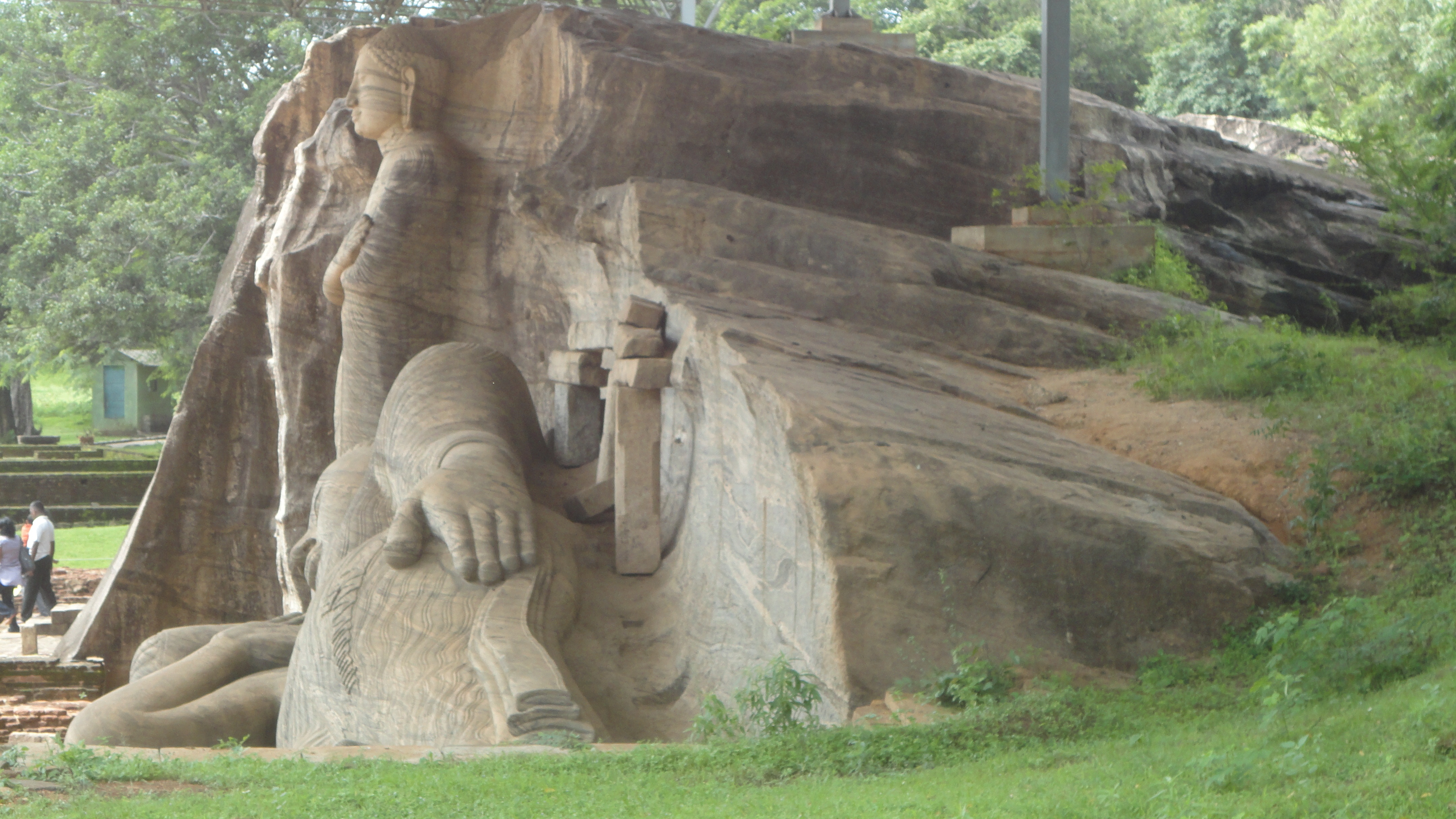
- The images of Gal Vihara, carved on a single, large rock face.

- Above: Location of Gal Vihara on the Indian subcontinent in South Asia; Below: Location in Sri Lanka; Gal Vihara (Sri Lanka)

Religion
- Affiliation: Buddhism

Location
- Country: Sri Lanka
- Interactive map of Gal Vihara (Uttararama)
- Coordinates: 7°57′57″N 81°00′18″E

Architecture
- Founder: Parakramabahu I
- Completed: 12th century

The Gal Vihara (Sinhala: ගල් විහාරය, lit. 'rock monastery'), and known originally as the Uttararama (Sinhala: උත්තරාරාමය, lit. 'the great monastery'), is a rock temple of the Buddha situated in the ancient city Polonnaruwa, the capital of the ancient Kingdom of Polonnaruwa, now present-day Polonnaruwa, in North Central Province, Sri Lanka. It was fashioned in the 12th century by King Parakramabahu I. The central feature of the temple is four rock relief statues of the Buddha, which have been carved into the face of a large granite gneiss rock. The images consist of a large seated figure, another smaller seated figure inside an artificial cavern, a standing figure, and a reclining figure. These are considered to be some of the best examples of ancient Sinhalese sculpting and carving arts, and have made the Gal Vihara the most visited monument at Polonnaruwa.

The images of Uttararama follow a different style from the images of the previous Anuradhapura period, and show some significant differences. The identity of the standing image is subject to a certain amount of dispute among historians and archaeologists, some of whom argue that it depicts the monk Ananda rather than the Buddha. Each of the images have been carved in a way that uses a maximum possible area of the rock, and their heights seem to have been decided based on the height of the rock itself. Each statue appears to have had its own image house, as indicated by the remains of brick walls at the site. The Uttararama was where Parakramabahu I held a congregation of monks to purify the Buddhist priesthood, and later drew up a code of conduct for them. This code of conduct has been recorded in an inscription on the same rock face containing the images of the Buddha.

== Uttararama ==
The Gal Vihara or 'rock monastery' (so named after the large rock face where the four images of the Buddha were carved) was originally named Uttararama 'the northern monastery'. It is located in Polonnaruwa, and according to the Cūḷavaṃsa was one of the more prominent of the hundred temples built throughout Lanka by King Parakramabahu I (1153–1186). The Cūḷavaṃsa mentions that Parakramabahu I had his workmen build three caves in the rock after finishing the temple: the Vijjadhara Guha ('cave of the spirits of knowledge'), the Nissina Patima Lena ('cave of the sitting image'), and the Nipanna Patima Guha ('cave of the sleeping image'). Although they are described as 'caves', only the Vijjadhara Guha is a cave, while the others were image houses similar to the Thivanka and Lankathilaka, with their walls connected to the rock face. These walls, which were evidently decorated with frescoes, have since been destroyed and only their bases now remain,

By the time Parakramabahu I ascended to the throne, the Buddhist priesthood in the country was divided into three fraternities: Abhayagiri vihāra, Jetavanaramaya, and Mahavihara. He held a congregation of monks to reconcile the three fraternities, and 'purified the order' by expelling corrupt monks. With the help of the elders of each fraternity, he later drew up a katikavata ('code of conduct') for Buddhist monks and recorded this in an inscription at Uttararama. The area in front of the images, which now resembles a terrace, is believed to be the location of the assembly hall where this congregation was held. The inscription recording the code has been carved on the flat, polished rock face between the Vijjadhara Guha and the standing image.

The Uttararama was abandoned during the fall of the Kingdom of Polonnaruwa. It had functioned as an educational establishment from its inception to its abandonment, being a centre of Buddhist education in the country.

== Images ==
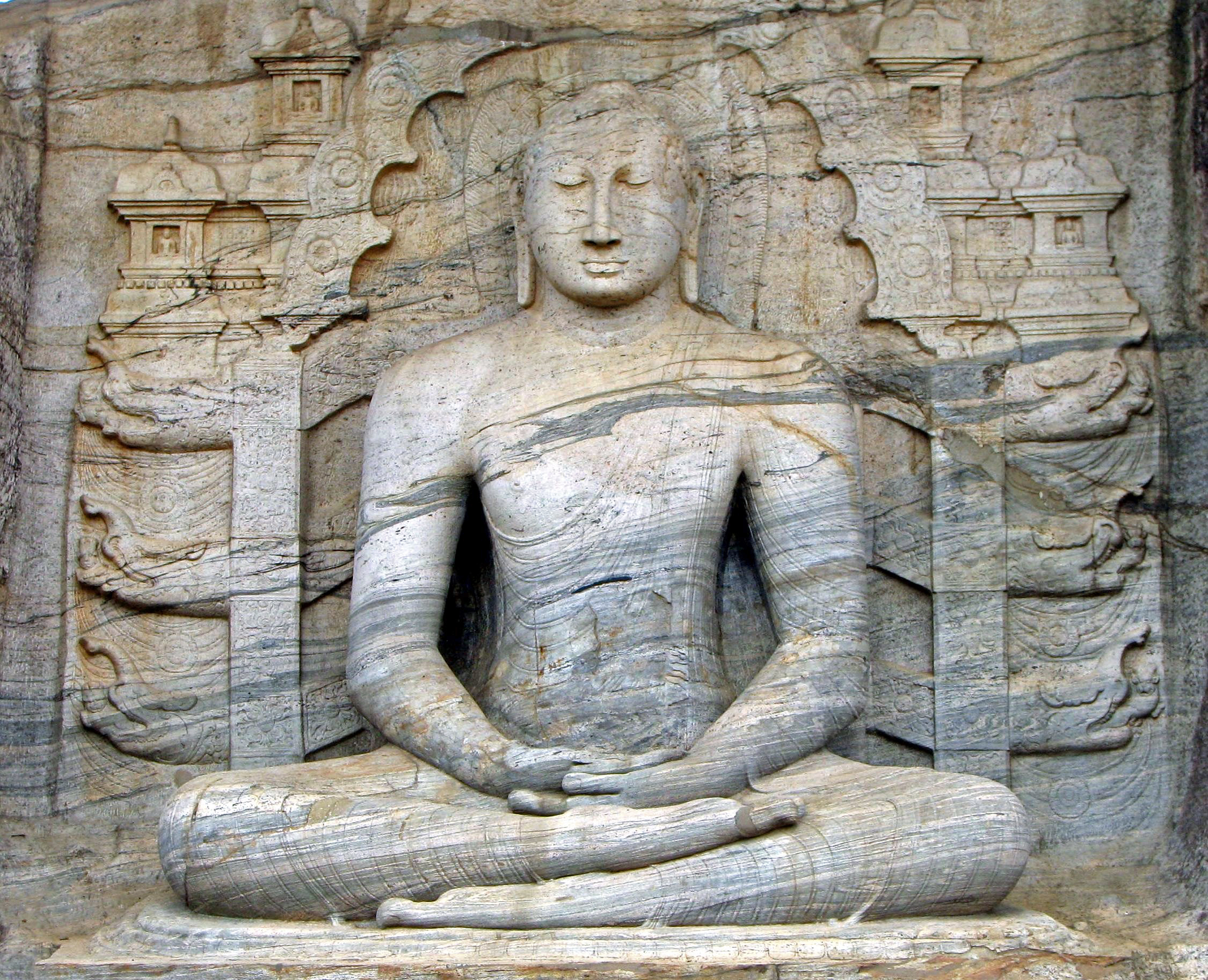
The seated image, which depicts the dhyana mudra, shows signs of Mahayana influence.

The main feature of Gal Vihara is the four images of the Buddha that have been carved on a single, large granite rock face, considered to be among the best examples of the rock carving and sculpting arts of the ancient Sinhalese. The rock has been cut almost 15 feet (4.6 m) deep to create a rock face to accommodate the statues, and is the only example in the country where a natural rock has been excavated to this extent for such a purpose. The images position the temple alongside some of the most significant monuments which survive from the ancient kingdoms of Sri Lanka, and make it the most celebrated and visited temple in Polonnaruwa. Three of the images are quite large; the smallest of them is more than 15 feet (4.6 m) tall, and the largest is more than 46 feet (14 m) long. However, the fourth image is just over 4 feet (1.2 m) and located inside an artificial cavern carved into the rock. A seated image is on the left side of the rock, and to the right is a cavern and another seated image. Further to the right are a standing image, and then a reclining image. Unlike other statues of the same period (such as the one found in the Lankathilaka image house), they are all well preserved, and therefore provide a good indication about less well-preserved examples. The size of each image seems to have been decided based on the height of the rock at that point, so that the maximum possible area could be used for it. According to the archaeologist Senarath Paranavithana, the images were evidently coated in gold in their early years. The style of the images differs somewhat from that of statues from the earlier Anuradhapura period. The most notable changes are the broader forehead in the Gal Vihara images. The robe is carved with two parallel lines, rather than the single line seen in the Anuradhapura period, influenced by the Amaravati school of art.

=== Seated image ===
The large seated image is 15 feet 2.5 inches (4.636 m) tall, and depicts the dhyana mudra. The seat was carved in the shape of a lotus flower, its base decorated with carvings of flowers and lions. The statue sits on a carved throne, decorated with makara images, with four small images of the Buddha (identical to the larger image) carved inside small chambers. This is an unusual feature in ancient Sinhalese sculpture, and is presumably the result of Mahayana influence.

=== Vidyadhara Guha ===
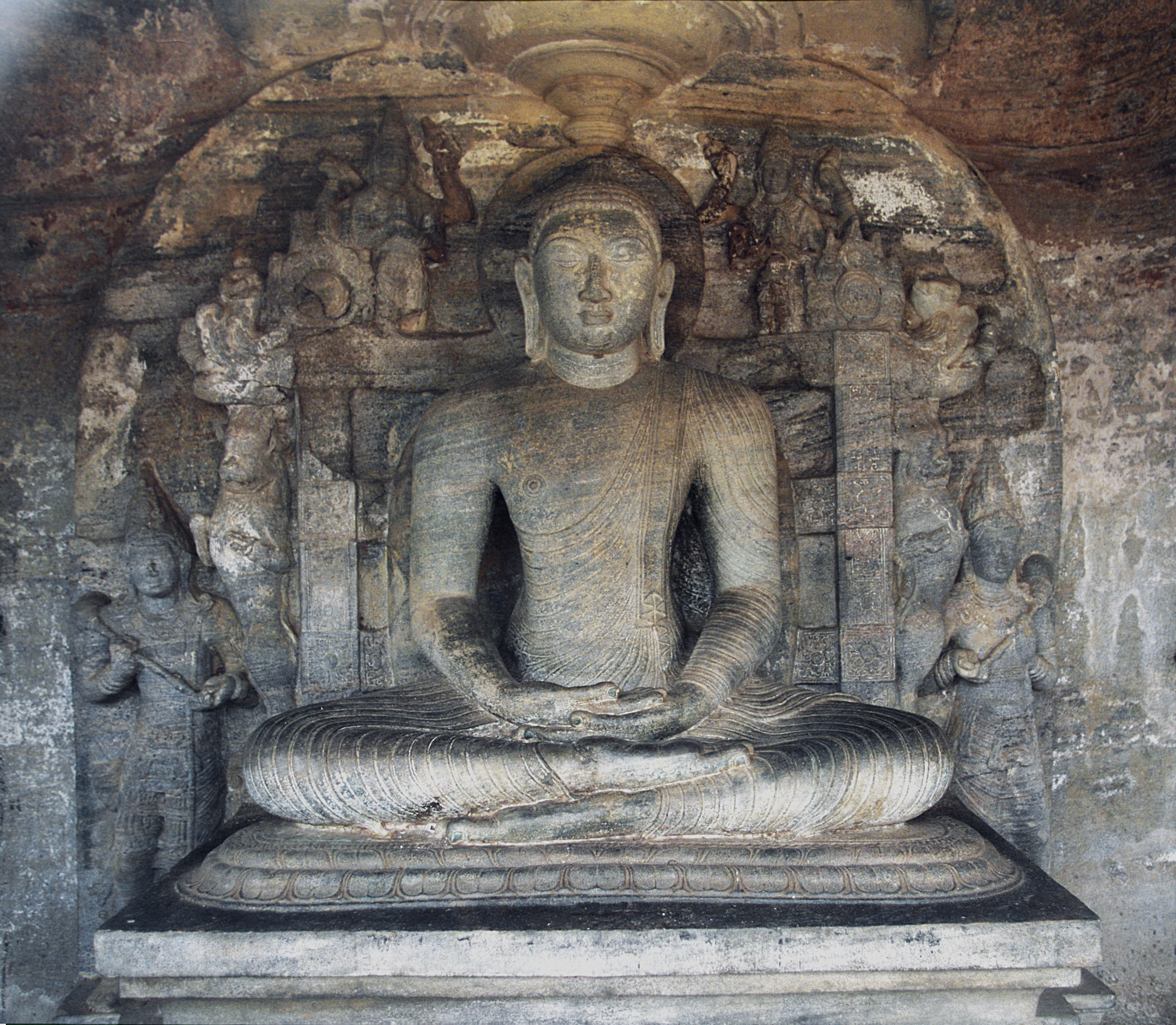
Vidyadhara Guha

A small statue only 4 feet 7 inches (1.40 m) in height, but similar in appearance to its larger neighbour, is located inside the artificial cave named the Vidyadhara Guha. The cave was created by carving 4.5 feet (1.4 m) into the rock, leaving four square shafted stone columns at the sides of the 26-foot (7.9 m) wide and 12-foot-9-inch (3.89 m) high opening. The base of the lotus shaped seat of the Buddha image here is also decorated with designs of lions. A throne and a parasol are carved behind it, more elaborate in design than the larger image. A prabhamandala, or halo, is carved behind the head of the statue, which rests between two four-armed deities. According to archaeologist HCP Bell, the god on the right is Brahma, and the god on the left is Vishnu. The walls of the cave were once decorated with frescoes, traces of which remain in the two corners at the back of the cave.

=== Standing image ===
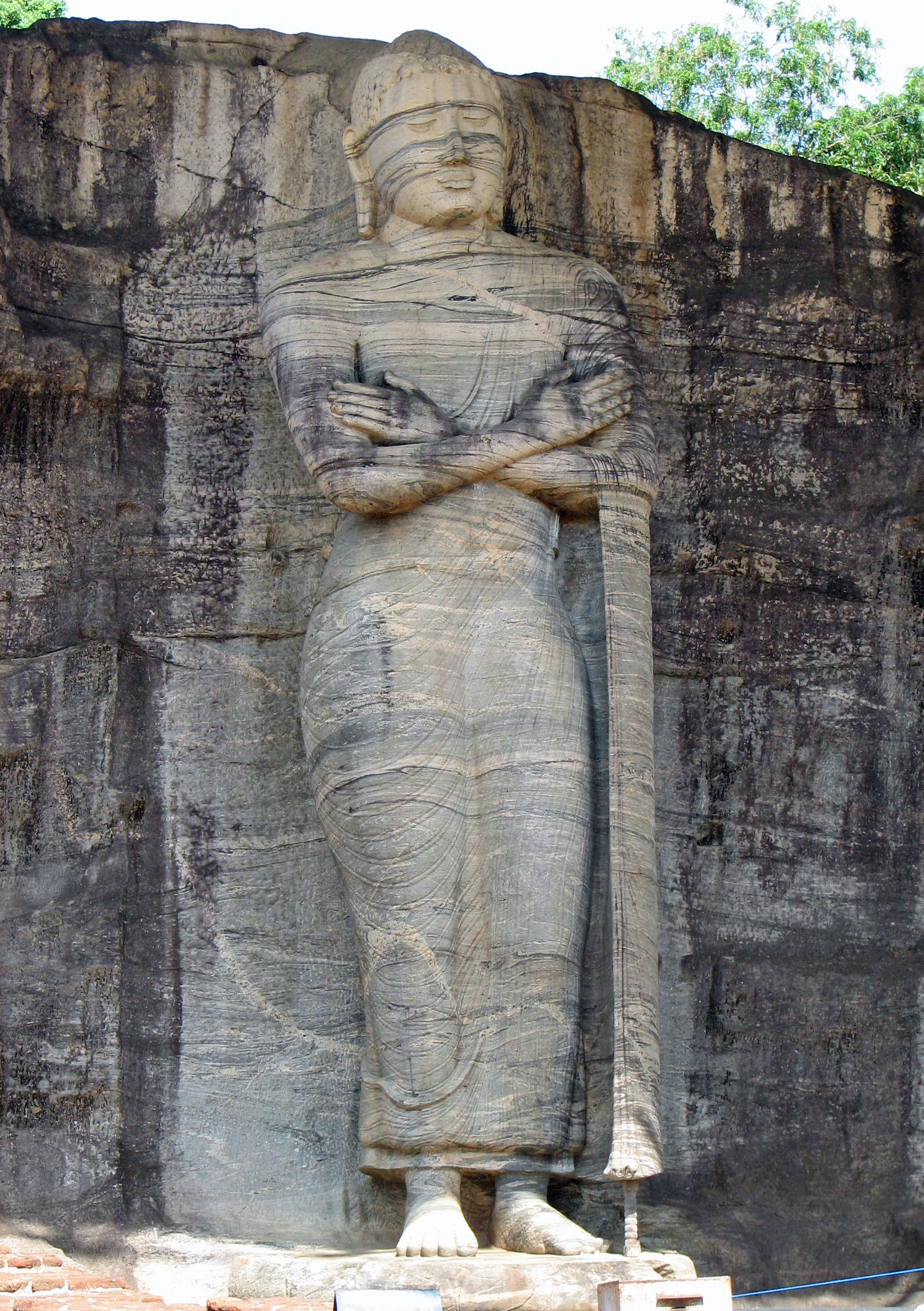
The standing image depicts an unusual mudra

The standing image is the focus of much discussion among historians and archaeologists, since there is a general belief that it is not a statue of the Buddha. The image is 22 feet 9 inches (6.93 m) tall, and stands on a low pedestal shaped like a lotus. It leans back in a relaxed manner, its arms folded across its chest. The statue's face carries a sorrowful expression and the reclining image—which depicts the Buddha's parinirvana—lies next to it, which has led some to believe that it is the monk Ānanda, who is lamenting the Buddha's demise at his deathbed. The remains of the walls, however, indicate that the two images were once in separate chambers, rather than next to each other. Paranavithana believes that the statue is of the Buddha, which depicts the para dukkha dukkhitha mudra or "sorrow for the sorrow of others". However, this is a rarely used gesture in Sinhalese sculpture, and is seen at only a few locations in the country. Another possibility is that the image shows the Buddha during his second week after enlightenment, which he spent gazing at the Bodhi Tree in gratitude for providing him shelter. The image is not mentioned in the Chulavamsa, which only mentions the other three. While this may be an indication that it is not an image of the Buddha, it is also possible that it may have been made at an earlier period than the others.

=== Reclining image ===
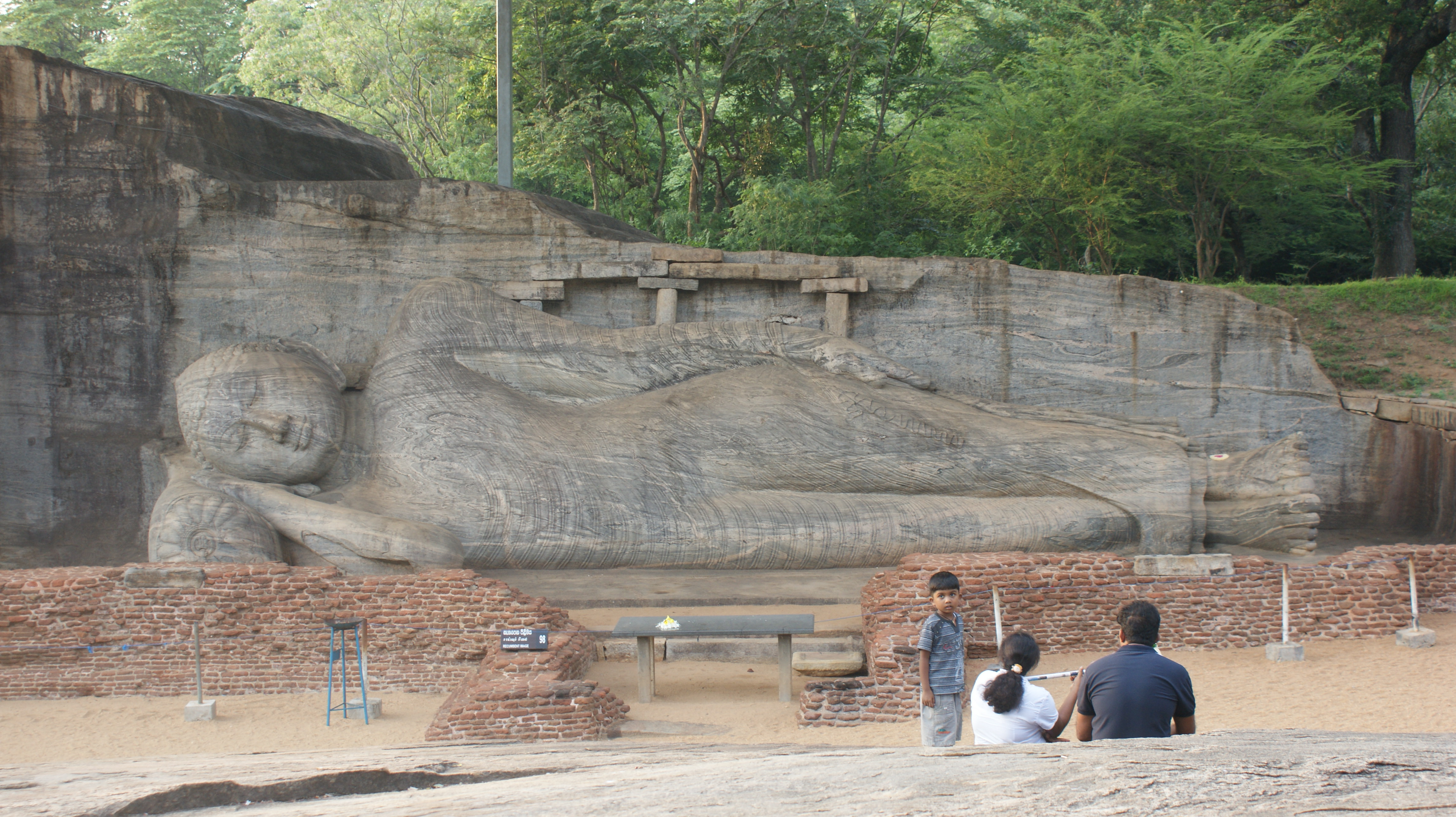
The reclining image, which depicts the Buddha's parinirvana, is the largest in Gal Vihara.

At 46 feet 4 inches (14.12 m) in length, the reclining image is the largest statue in Gal Vihara, and also one of the largest sculptures in Southeast Asia. It depicts the parinirvana of the Buddha, who is lying on his right side with the right arm supporting the head on a bolster, while the left arm lies along the body and thigh. The palm of the right hand and the soles of the feet have a single lotus flower carved on them. Charles Godakumbure, a former Commissioner of the Archaeological Department of Sri Lanka, has stated that the bolster upon which the Buddha rests his head has been so well carved that it looks like a cotton stuffed pillow rather than one carved from rock. The upper foot—the left foot of the image—is slightly withdrawn to indicate that the image depicts that the Buddha has attained parinirvana, and is not merely lying down. Unlike the other images, the reclining image does not have a decorated pedestal, and lies on levelled bare rock. On the wall behind the image, several sockets have been carved into the rock, as well as the remains of two stone columns, suggesting that its now missing image house had a wooden roof.

== 3D Documentation ==
A 3D documentation done by the Zamani Project of the Hatadage in Polonnaruwa was carried out in 2019.

== See also ==
- List of colossal sculptures in situ

== Bibliography ==
- Amarasinghe, Malinga (1998). පොළොන්නරුවේ නටබුන් (The Ruins of Polonnaruwa) (in Sinhala). S. Godage & Brothers. ISBN 955-20-3051-X.
- Aves, Edward (2003). Sri Lanka. Footprint Travel Guides. ISBN 978-1-903471-78-4.
- Basnayake, H. T. (1986). Sri Lankan Monastic Architecture. Sri Satguru Publications. ISBN 81-7030-009-6.
- Kleiner, Fred S. (2008). Gardner's Art Through the Ages: A Global History. Cengage Learning. ISBN 978-0-495-11549-6.
- Prematilleke, P. L.; Karunaratne, L. K. (2004). Polonnaruwa - The Silver Capital of Sri Lanka. Colombo: Central Cultural Fund, Ministry of Cultural Affairs. ISBN 955-613-111-6.
- Sarachchandra, B. S. (1977). අපේ සංස්කෘතික උරුමය (Cultural Heritage) (in Sinhala). Silva, V. P.
- Siriweera, W. I. (2004). History of Sri Lanka. Dayawansa Jayakodi & Company. ISBN 955-551-257-4.
- Wijesinha, M. L. C.; Turnour, G. (1996). Mahavansa. Asian Educational Services. ISBN 978-81-206-1154-2.

=== Further reading ===
- von Schroeder, Ulrich. (1990). Buddhist Sculptures of Sri Lanka. (752 p.; 1620 illustrations). Hong Kong: Visual Dharma Publications, Ltd. ISBN 962-7049-05-0
- von Schroeder, Ulrich. (1992). The Golden Age of Sculpture in Sri Lanka - Masterpieces of Buddhist and Hindu Bronzes from Museums in Sri Lanka, [catalogue of the exhibition held at the Arthur M. Sackler Gallery, Washington, D. C., 1 November 1992 – 26 September 1993]. Hong Kong: Visual Dharma Publications, Ltd. ISBN 962-7049-06-9
