= Kataragama =

Kataragama කතරගම கதிர்காமம்
- Location within Sri Lanka
- Coordinates: 6°25′00″N 81°20′00″E
- Country: Sri Lanka
- Province: Uva Province
- District: Monaragala
- Time zone: UTC+5:30 (Sri Lanka Standard Time Zone)
  - Summer (DST): UTC+6 (Summer time)

Kataragama (Sinhala: කතරගම, romanized: Kataragama , Tamil: கதிர்காமம், romanized: Katirkāmam) is a pilgrimage town sacred to Buddhist, Hindu and indigenous Vedda people of Sri Lanka. People from South India also go there to worship. The town has the Kataragama temple, a shrine dedicated to Skanda Kumara also known as Kataragama deviyo. Kataragama is located in the Monaragala District of Uva province, Sri Lanka. It is 228 km (142 mi) southeast of Colombo. Although Kataragama was a small village in medieval times, today it is a fast-developing township surrounded by jungle in the southeastern region of Sri Lanka.

The ancient Kiri Vehera Buddhist stupa, which is believed to be built by the regional king Mahasena in the 6th century BC is also a major attraction in Kataragama area. The town has a venerable history dating back to the last centuries BCE. It was the seat of government of many Sinhalese kings during the days of Rohana kingdom. Since the 1950s the town has undergone many improvements with successive governments investing in public transportation, medical facilities, and business development and hotel services. It adjoins the popular Yala National Park.

== Etymology ==
The first reference to this village by this name is in the 6th century AD Pali chronicle Mahavamsa, referring to the place as Kājaragāma. It is mentioned in Mahavamsa that the nobles of Kajaragama were among those took part in the festival of the Bodhi Tree when it was brought over by Sangamitta Theri. Some scholars derive Kataragama from Karthikeya Grama, literally meaning Village of Kartikeya, which was shortened in Pali as Kājaragāma and later evolved to Kataragama. However, not all scholars accept this explanation.

The literal Sinhalese meaning of Kataragama is the "village in the desert", due to its location in a dry area, stemmed from the words Katara meaning Desert and gama meaning village. According to a folk etymology, the Tamil name Kathirkāmam is said to be evolved from the combination of two words Kathir (meaning glory of light) and kāmam (Love), which according to the legend is "where the light of Murugan mingled with the love of Valli".

The aboriginal Vedda community used to refer to this deity as O' Vedda or Oya Vedda, meaning "river hunter". The Sri Lankan Moors visiting this place pay homage to a Muslim saint known as al-Khidir, who according to them gave his name to the Islamic shrine at this place, and therefore attributing to the place etymology.

== History ==
=== Early history ===
The general vicinity of Kataragama has yielded evidence of human habitation at least 125,000 years ago. It has also yielded evidence of Mesolithic and Neolithic habitations.

=== Historic period ===
During the historic period, the general area was characterised by small reservoirs for water conservation and associated paddy cultivation. Kataragama village is first mentioned in the historical annals known as Mahavamsa written in the 5th century CE. It mentions a town named Kajjaragama from which important dignitaries came to receive the sacred Bo sapling sent from Ashoka's Mauryan Empire in 288 BCE.

It functioned as the capital of number of kings of the Ruhuna kingdom. It provided refuge to many kings from the north when the north was invaded by South Indian kingdoms. It is believed that the area was abandoned around the 13th century.

Based on archeological evidence found, it is believed that the Kiri Vehera was either renovated or built during the first century BCE. There are number of others inscriptions and ruins. By the 16th century the Kataragamadevio shrine at Kataragama had become synonymous with Skanda-Kumara who was a guardian deity of Sinhala Buddhism. The town was popular as a place of pilgrimage for Hindus from India and Sri Lanka by the 15th century. The popularity of the deity at the Kataragama temple was recorded by the Pali chronicles of Thailand such as Jinkalmali in the 16th century. There are Buddhist and Hindu legends that attribute supernatural events to the locality. Scholars such as Paul Younger and Heinz Bechert speculate that rituals practiced by the native priests of Kataragama temple betray Vedda ideals of propitiation. Hence they believe the area was of Vedda veneration that was taken over by the Buddhist and Hindus in the medieval period.

== Kataragama temple ==
=== Temple of Syncretism ===
Kataragama is a multi-religious sacred town. In spite of the differences of caste and creed, many Sri Lankans show reverence to God Kataragama. They honor him as a very powerful deity and beg divine help to overcome their personal problems or for success in business enterprises, etc., with the fervent hope that their requests will be granted. They believe that God Kataragama exists and is vested with power to assist those who appeal to him with faith and devotion in times of distress or calamity.

=== Hindu Katirkamam ===
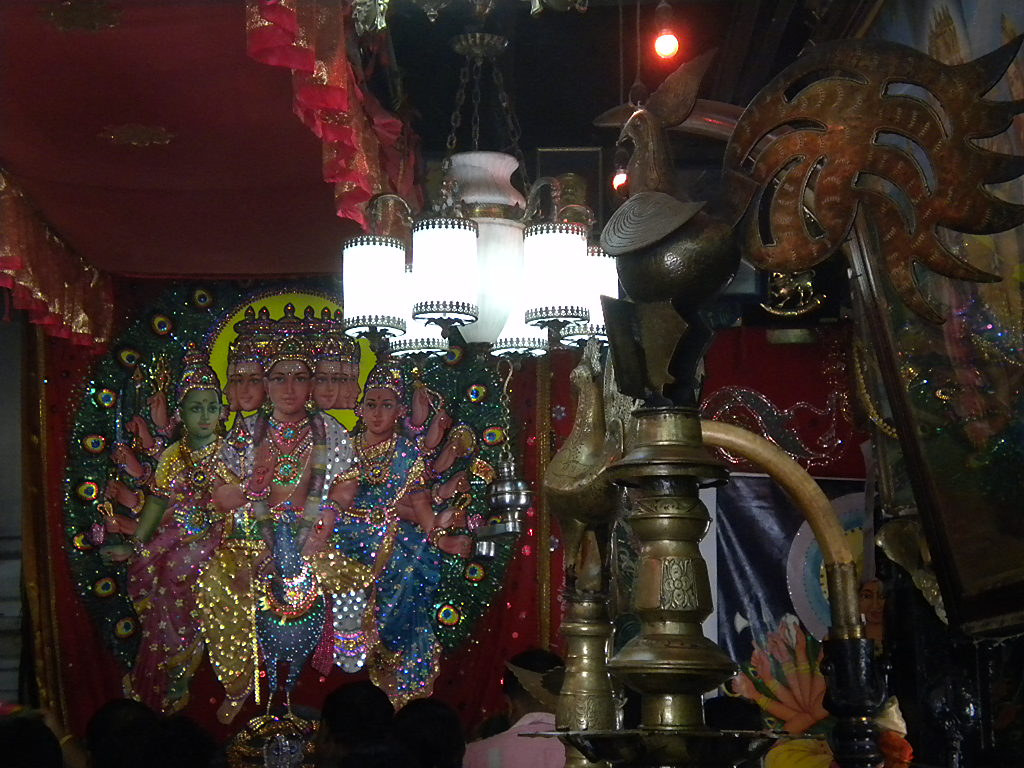
Interior of the Maha Devale, the Yantra is kept behind a curtain that figures Murukan with his two wives

Tamil Hindus of Sri Lanka and South India refer to the place as Katirkamam. Katirkaman is associated with Skanda-Murukan. Saivite Hindus of South India call him Subrahmanya as well. He is known as Kandasamy, Katiradeva, Katiravel, Kartikeya, and Tarakajith. Some of these names are derived from the root katir from Katirkamam. "Katir" means formless light. The Deity is depicted with six faces and twelve hands or one face and four hands. Out of love for Murugan and to mitigate bad karma, bhaktars pierce their cheeks and tongues with vels, pull large chariots carrying murthi of Murugan with large hooks pierced through the skin of their backs. This practice is known as kavadi. Murugan's vahana or vehicle is Mayil, the peacock.

There is a related shrine called Sella Katirkamam dedicated to the beloved elephant-faced God Ganesha nearby, who is known as Murugan's elder brother. The local Manik Ganga or Manika Gangai (River of Gems) is a place of ablution where a sacred bath is taken to purify oneself. Local residents declare that one can be healed of ailments by bathing in it from its high gem content and the medicinal properties of the roots of trees that line the river through the jungle.

=== Buddhist Kataragama ===
Many Sinhala Buddhists of Sri Lanka believe that Kataragama deviyo is a guardian deity of Buddhism and he is the presiding deity of Kataragama temple. Kataragama is one of the 16 principal places of Buddhist pilgrimage to be visited in Sri Lanka. According to the chronicle of Sri Lankan history, the Mahawamsa, when the Bo sapling of Bodhi Tree, under which Gotama Buddha attained enlightenment in North India was brought to the city of Anuradhapura 2,300 years ago, the warriors or Kshatriyas from Kataragama were present on the occasion to pay homage and respect. The Bo tree behind the Kataragama temple is one of the eight saplings (Ashta Phala Ruhu Bodhi) of Sri Maha Bodhiya in Anuradapura, Sri Lanka. This tree was planted in the 3rd century BC.

The Buddhist Kiri Vehera Dagoba which stands in close to the Kataragama devalaya was built by the King Mahasena. According to the legend, Buddha, on his third and the last visit to Sri Lanka, was believed to have met King Mahasena, who ruled over the Kataragama area in 580 BC. It is said that King Mahasena met Buddha and listened to his discourse. As a token of gratitude, the Dagoba was built on that exact spot where it now stands. Thus the local Sinhalese Buddhists believe that Kataragama was sanctified by Buddha.

=== Pre-Hindu and Buddhist origins ===
The deity at Kataragama is indigenous and long-celebrated in Sri Lankan lore and legend, and originally resides on the top of mountain called Wædahiti Kanda (or hill of the indigenous Vedda people) just outside the Kataragama town. Since ancient times an inseparable connection between the Kataragama God and his domain has existed. At one time the local deity was identified with God Saman, a guardian deity of Buddhism and Sri Lanka.

As was the Sinhalese tradition, local ancestors, rulers and kings, who did a great service to the country or community were ordained as deities. According to the legendary history, God Saman was an ancient ruler of the Deva people in the Sabaragamuwa area of Sri Lanka. Therefore, some believe that King Mahasena, who built Kiri Vehera in Kataragama later came to be worshiped as God Kataragama.

Till today the indigenous Vedda people come to venerate at the temple complex from their forest abodes. As a link to the Vedda past, the temple holds its annual festival that celebrates the God's courtship and marriage to a Vedda princess in July to August.

== Education ==
There are local government schools that provide education to primary, secondary and higher secondary students in the Sinhala medium.

1. President Central College -Kataragama
2. Sellakataragama Maha Vidyalaya
3. Detagamuwa Junior School
4. Gothamigama Junior School
5. Kataragama Primary School

== Population ==
Since its abandonment, during the 1800s the population of the village did not exceed over a few dozen. Since the 1950s the town has experienced and increase in population. Big majority of the residents are Sinhalese. During July and August the population swells to a few hundred thousand due to the annual festival held in the honor of the deity.

Kataragama has a total population of over 18,220 (2012).

| Ethnicity | Population | % Of Total |
|---|---|---|
| Sinhalese | 17,421 | 95.61 |
| Sri Lankan Tamils | 749 | 4.11 |
| Indian Tamils | 18 | 0.10 |
| Sri Lankan Moors | 17 | 0.09 |
| Others (including Burgher, Malay) | 15 | 0.08 |
| Total | 18,220 | 100 |

Source: Statistical Information of Kataragama Divisional Secretariat

== Transport ==
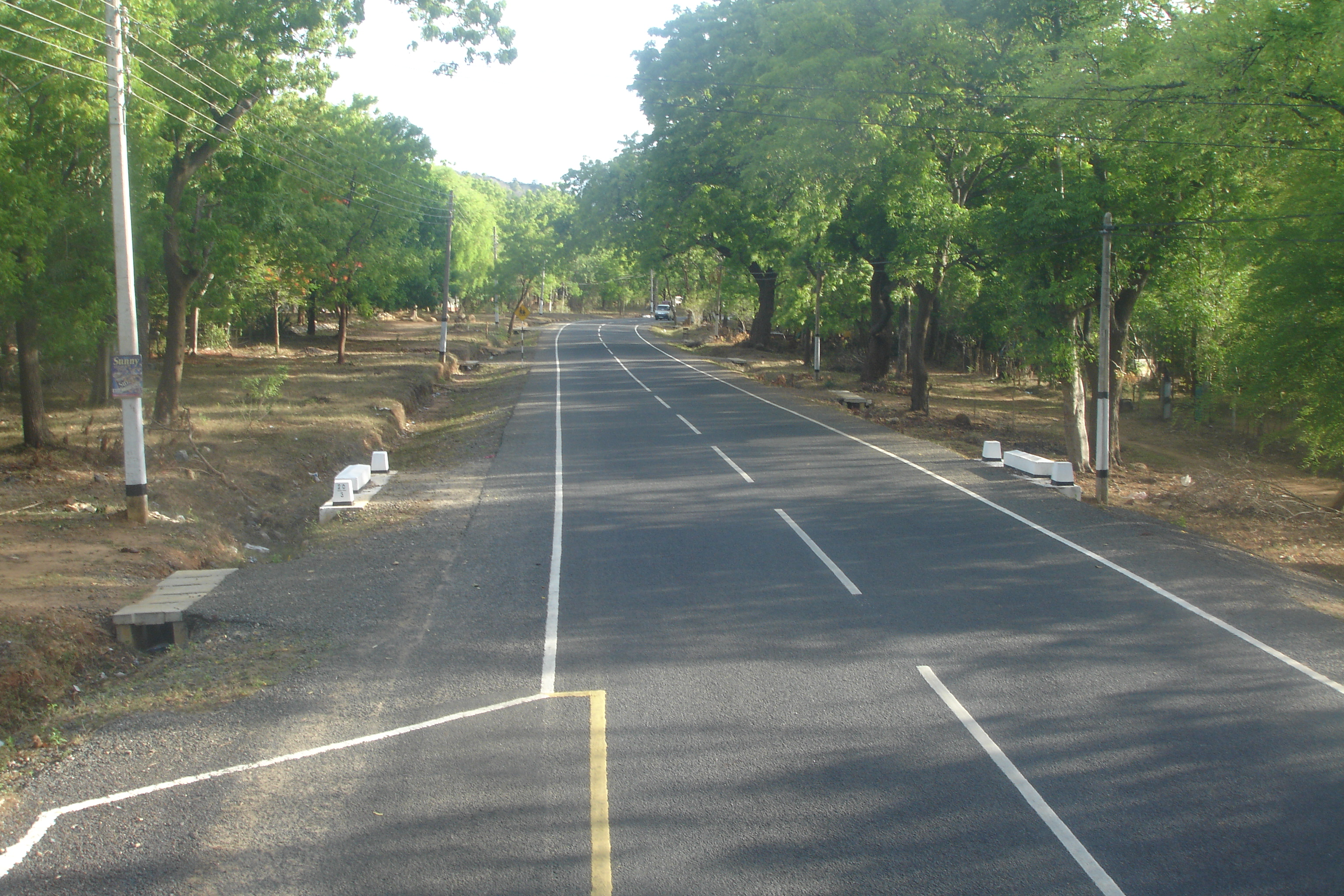
Colombo-Kataragama Main Road

Most of the many thousands who visit Kataragama travel by vehicles. Even today, despite the lure of modern transport, hundreds of dedicated pilgrims stick to the ancient practice of journeying to Kataragama on foot.

In 1992, it was proposed to extend the railway from Matara to Kataragama and beyond. The Kataragama railway extension is being constructed under a three-phase accelerated development program. The first phase has begun and will consist of the 27 km stretch from Matara to Beliatta costing 60 million rupees; construction has already commenced on the bridge over the Nilwala River by the State Engineering Corporation. The entire project is expected to take six years to complete and will cost around 3 billion rupees. The project is funded by the Chinese government and it is expected to be completed by 2015.

== See also ==
- Kataragama Peak
- Hinduism in Sri Lanka
- Buddhism in Sri Lanka
