= Dedimunda deviyo =

Sinhalese Buddhist deity

- Other names: Dedimunda Dewatha Bandara
- Region: Sri Lanka

Dedimunda Deviyo (also known as Dedimunda Dewatha Bandara Sinhala: දැඩිමුණ්ඩ දෙවියෝ) is a deity, worshiped by Sinhalese Buddhist people in Sri Lanka. He is considered as a guardian deity of Buddha Śāsana in the country. People believe that he has the power to heal mortal illnesses, epidemics, eradicate evil possessions and giving hopes of babies to married women. The cult of Dedimunda deity is believed to have come into prominence during the Kandyan era as he is portrayed in the attire of a Kandyan chief with a cane and a sceptre in his right hand, which symbolizes his suzerainty over the Kandy area.

== Name ==
Deḍimuṇḍa Deviyo is identified in various names around the country. Alutnuvara Devatā Baṇḍāra, Meṇik Baṇḍāra, Ūve Baṇḍāra, Aluthnuwara Deviyo and Kīrti Baṇḍāra are some of the names that are being used. The British scholar Hugh Nevill (1847-1897) describes the Dedimunda in various names such as Devata Bandara, Veera Vikum, Yahala Bandara and Yahal Deviyo.

== Legends ==
There are various stories and legends about deity Dedimunda. According to one story deity Dadimunda was born in the Talagiri mountain to a Yaksa (devil) chief called Pūrṇaka and his Naga queen Erandathi. He is also said to be a grandson of Vesamuni. Because of his lineage, he has well connected to both Yakṣa and Nāga clans. It is said that deity Dedimunda first landed at Dondra (Devinuvara) area in southern Sri Lanka from South India. After landed at Devinuwara, he went to Seenigama, and later to Aluth Nuwara area in the Kegalle District where he made his permanent abode.

Another folklore says that there was a high cast superhuman called Devaka Bandara, who served at King Wickramasinghe as a chief commander. It is said that after his death he became the Dedimunda deity.

According to another story, at the enlightenment of Gautama Buddha, Māra and his vast army came to defeat Prince Siddhartha and prevent him becoming the Buddha. At that time, Deḍimuṇḍa Deviyo has been sent to defeat the Māra and his men by God Vaiśravaṇa (Vesamuni). The legend says that, there he not only destroyed the Māra's aboard situated at Mahā Meru, but has also been granted to protect the Buddha Sāsana in Sri Lanka for 5,500 years by Gautama Buddha. Later, this grant was bestowed again and again by gods, such as Viṣṇu, Śakra, Vaiśravaṇa and Skandha Kumāra. The latter describes, his survival from a shipwreck while returning to Sri Lanka and his miracle of giving life to the pregnant queen and her baby from the cremated ashes. The child was named as "Dāpulu", denoting born from the ashes.

Another story says that the Dedimunda was the only deity who didn't flee in fear at the Prince Siddhartha's (Bodhisatva) struggle with Mara army. And at the time when the Prince Siddhartha's struggle with Màra (when Màra tried to stop the enlightenment of Lord Buddha), it's told that god Dedimunda shrunk his body size into a small size and hid beneath the cloth which Prince Siddhartha was wearing while all the other gods escaped.

== Shrines ==
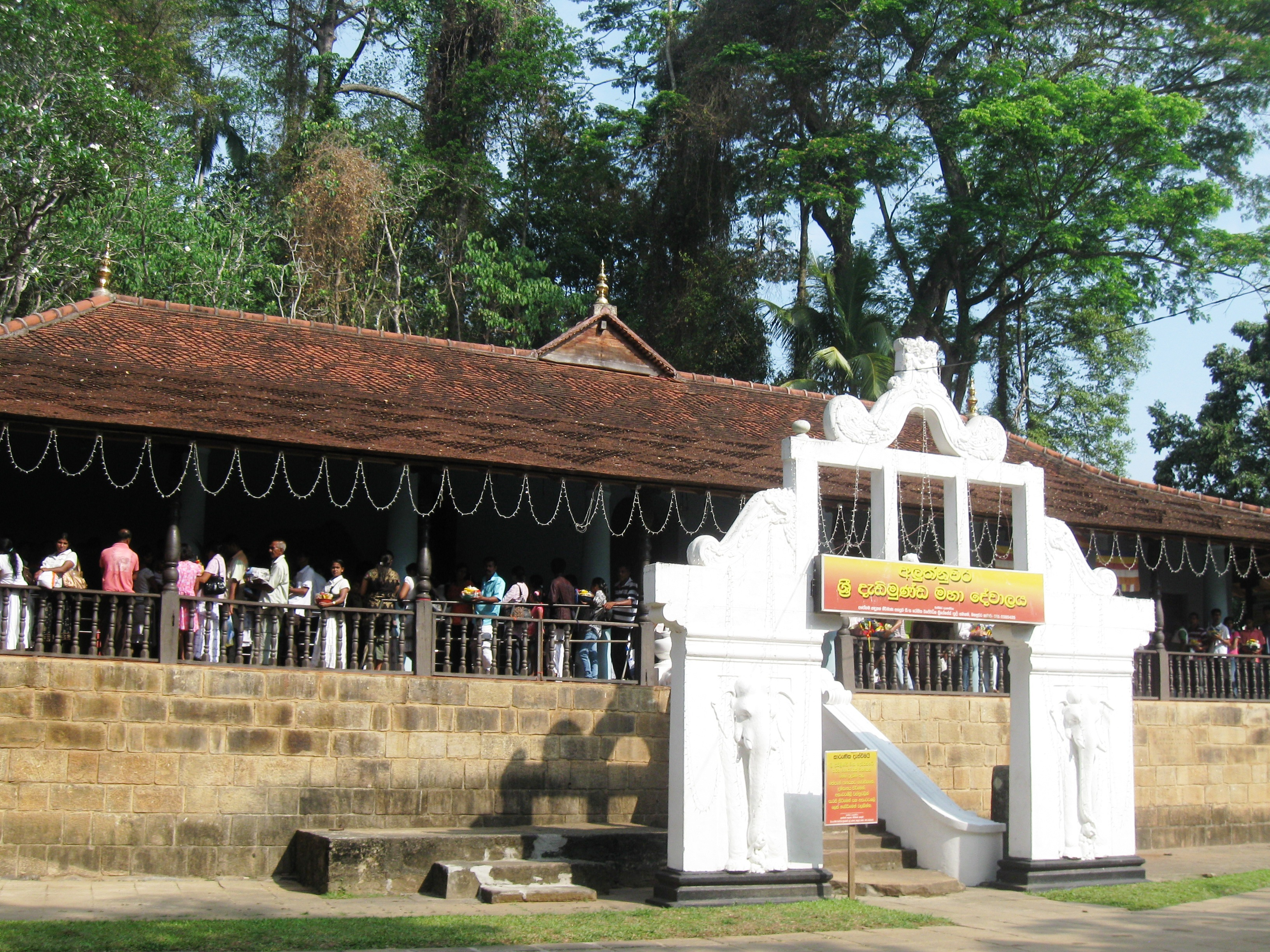
Aluth Nuwara Dedimunda Devalaya

Aluth Nuwara Dedimunda Devalaya, the main shrine dedicated to Dedimunda deviyo is located in Aluth Nuwara area near to the Mawanella town. The shrine is considered as a special place of Dedimunda worship among the people and on the Kemmura days (Wednesdays and Saturdays) people come to offer rituals and make vows to the deity.

Beside the chief shrine at Aluth Nuwara, number of Dedimunda Devala has been set up with related to many Upulvan shrines in the country since he is regarded as a general (chief adhikar and minister) of deity Upulvan.

It is believed that he presently visits two main temples, Aluth Nuvara Deḍimuṇḍa Devalaya and Kotte Raja Maha Vihara Deḍimuṇḍa Devalaya.
