= Kiri Vehera =

Ancient stupa in Kataragama, Sri Lanka

- කතරගම කිරි වෙහෙර
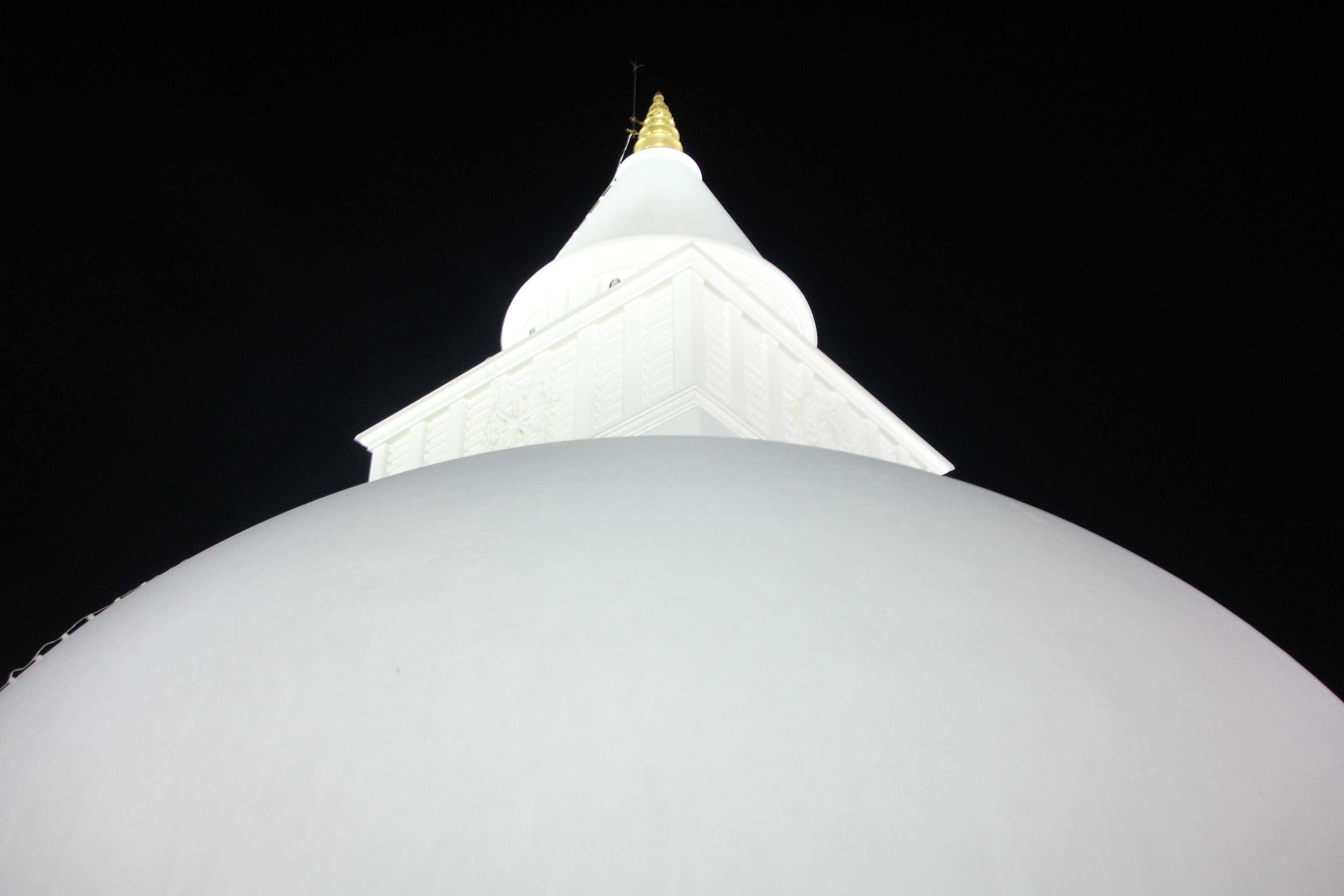
- Kiri Vehera stupa at night

Religion
- Affiliation: Buddhism
- District: Moneragala
- Province: Uva Province
- Region: Wellassa

Location
- Location: Kataragama, Sri Lanka
- Interactive map of Kiri Vehera
- Coordinates: 06°42′N 81°33′E

Architecture
- Type: Stupa
- Founder: King Mahanaga (3rd century BC)

Kiri Vehera is an ancient stupa situated in Monaragala, Kataragama, Sri Lanka. This stupa probably dates back to the 3rd century BC and is believed to have been built by King Mahanaga brother of king Devanampiyatissa; a regional ruler of Kataragama area. One of the most popular Buddhist pilgrimage sites in the country, Kiri Vehera is among the Solosmasthana, the 16 most sacred Buddhist pilgrimage sites of ancient Sri Lanka. This stupa which is 95 ft. in height with a circumference of 280 ft. is located 800 m North to the famous Ruhunu Maha Kataragama Devalaya. Venerable Kobawaka Dhamminda Thera is the present Chief Prelate of Kirivehera Rajamaha Viharaya.

== Inscriptions ==
Two inscriptions belonging to the 2nd century C.E. have been unearthed at the Kiri Vehera Stupa site. Of them, one inscription records a donor named Mahadali Mahana raja who is a local ruler of the Principality of Ruhuna. The Kiri Vehera Stupa is mentioned in this inscription by the name Mangalamahaseya of the Kajaragama raji maha vehera.

== See also ==
- Kataragama deviyo
- Kataragama Bodhiya
