= Atmabodhendra Saraswati =

Kanchi Matha a traveler

Atma Bodhendra Saraswati was the 58th Pontiff of the Kanchi Matha from 1586 AD to 1638 AD. He was a native of Vridhachalam, Tamil Nadu. He was born in the year 1586. His pre-monastic name was Visvesvara. In some texts name him as Vishwakendra Saraswati or Girvanendra Saraswati. Sri Neelakanta Dikshitar in Guru Ratna Malika praised him as Girvanendra Saraswati of Kanchi Kamakoti Peetam. He toured south India extensively and stayed at Benares. He wrote a commentary on the Vedic Sri Rudram. It was Atma Bodhendhra who instructed the great Avadhuta Sri Sadasiva Brahmendra to write the Guru ratna Malika stotram on the Gurus of the Kanchi Kamakoti Peetam. For Sadasiva brahmendra saraswathi and Atma Bodendra Saraswathi, the common guru is 57th Pontiff of Kanchi Kamakoti Peetam, Sri Paramasivendra Saraswathi who attained siddhi at Tiruvengadu. Atma Bodhendra Saraswathi is the immediate guru of Bodhendra Saraswathi, the 59th pontiff of Sri Kanchi Mutt who attained siddhi at Govindapuram, near Kumbakonam.

Sri Atma Bodhendra Saraswathi attained Siddhi on the banks of the river Dakshina Pinakini, in 1638 AD. The Maha Samadhi of Sri Atma Bodhendra Saraswathi is located in Vadavambalam, in villupuram district. The Adhistanam was discovered by Pujyasri Chandrasekarendra Saraswathi swamigal and was consecrated on 17 January 1927. The second Kumbabhishekam was performed on 17 January 1981. The Adhistanam was again renovated and Kumbabhishekam done on 21 October 2016.
