= Anjaneya Temple, Alamelumangapuram =

Religion
- Affiliation: Hinduism
- District: Chennai
- Deity: Hanuman

Location
- Location: Chennai
- State: Tamil Nadu
- Country: India

Architecture
- Completed: 1986

The Anjaneya Temple at Alamelumangapuram, a part of Mylapore in Chennai, India was constructed at the directions of Jayendra Saraswathi, the Shankaracharya of Kanchi matha.

== History ==
The idol was installed on 31 March 1985 and consecrated on 26 June 1986.

== Architecture ==
The temple has the tallest statue of Hanuman in Chennai – about 14 foot high. The idol was made and installed at the request of Jayendra Saraswathi. At present, there are shrines for Hayagriva, Garudar, Ganapathy, a small shrine for two seated and one standing Anjaneya idols, a shrine for Kothandaramar with Sita and Lakshmana.

The temple is known for its koti archana wherein one crore names of Hanuman are being recited over a period of two years.

== See also ==
- Religion in Chennai
