= Vellore Central Prison =

Prison in Vellore, Tamil Nadu, India

- Location in Tamil Nadu Vellore Central Prison (India)
- Location: Thorappadi Vellore; 12.8858°N 79.1204°E
- Security class: Central Prison
- Capacity: 2,208
- Opened: 1830
- Managed by: Tamil Nadu Prison Department

Notable prisoners
- Inayatullah Khan Mashriqi, Sri Vikrama Rajasinha of Kandy, C. Rajagopalachari, V. V. Giri, R. Venkataraman, C. N. Annadurai, K. Kamaraj

Vellore Central Prison (established in 1830) is a prison in Vellore, Tamil Nadu, India.

It is the largest jail in the district and 2nd largest in Tamil Nadu after puzhal central prison, Convicts sentenced to imprisonment are confined in the jail from various districts of the Presidency as well as from Burma. Many prisoners sentenced to transpiration by the courts of this Presidency are retained when considered physically unfit for deportation to Andaman. The expenditure in the jail is recovered by the value of the convict labour.

The chief industry carried out in the jail is weaving. A great variety of clothes of various patterns as well as table clothes, gunnies, choir mats, carpets etc. are woven. The central jail is famous for its carpets. The manufacture was first taught to the convicts by a carpet weaver of Ellore. The fabrics are woven and sold in England. Carpentry, shoe making, iron and brass work and tent making are also carried out.

By extreme hard work and good conduct, convicts may earn a remission not exceeding 1/6 of the total period of imprisonment awarded them.

There is a small sub jail attached to the central prison to accommodate the remand and under-trail prisoners of this dist. They will be sent to the concerned courts on the dates under Police Escorts. The prison is protected by a live wiring fence.

People of significance who were imprisoned here include

Sl no	Name	Prison term	Popular for being	Remarks
1	Sri Vikrama Rajasinha	2 March 1815- 30 January 1832 [†]	The last of four Kings, to rule the last Sinhalese monarchy of the Kingdom of Kandy in Sri Lanka	Jailed after being deposed by the British
2	C. Rajagopalachari	21 December 1921 - 20 March 1922	The last Governor-General of India (1948–50)	Arrested for his role in India's freedom struggle
3	Inayatullah Khan Mashriqi	19 March 1940- 19 January 1942	Founder of the Khaksar Tehrik	Arrested for refusing to disband Khaksar Tehrik
4	K. Kamaraj	December 1940 - November 1941	Third Chief Minister of Madras State [now Tamil Nadu] (1954–63)	Arrested under Defence of India Act for speeches that opposed popular contributions to World War II funds.
5	V. V. Giri	Bet. August 1942 & 1946	Fourth President of India (1969–74)	Jailed for his role in India's freedom struggle; also was in Amravati District Jail, Nagpur Central Jail etc.
6	R. Venkataraman	c.1943	Eighth President of India (1987–92)	Imprisoned in 1941 for his role in India's freedom struggle
7	Vinoba Bhave	c.1943	Advocate of Nonviolence and human rights; leader of the Bhoodan Movement (1951-1960s)	Got an imprisonment of three years at Vellore and Seoni jails
8	C. N. Annadurai	16 August - 24 October 1962	First Chief Minister of Tamil Nadu (1967–69) [†]	Arrested for his role in the anti-Hindi agitations of Tamil Nadu
9	Suba Veerapandian	late 1996	Dravidian ideologue; founder and general secretary of Dravida Iyakka Tamizhar Peravai (2007-)	Imprisoned for his vocal support to the Liberation Tigers of Tamil Eelam (LTTE).
10	Jayendra Saraswathi	November 11, 2004 - 5 January 2005	69th Shankaracharya of the Kanchi Kamakoti Peetham (1960 – 2018) [†]	Arrested in connection with the Sankararaman murder case; got bail on 5 January 2005; acquitted along with other individuals of all charges by a Puducherry special court in 2013.

[†] = died in prison / office
