= Satya Chandrashekharendra Saraswati =

Seventy first Head of Sri Kanchi Kamakoti Peetam

His Holiness Jagadguru Sri Satya Chandrashekharendra Saraswati
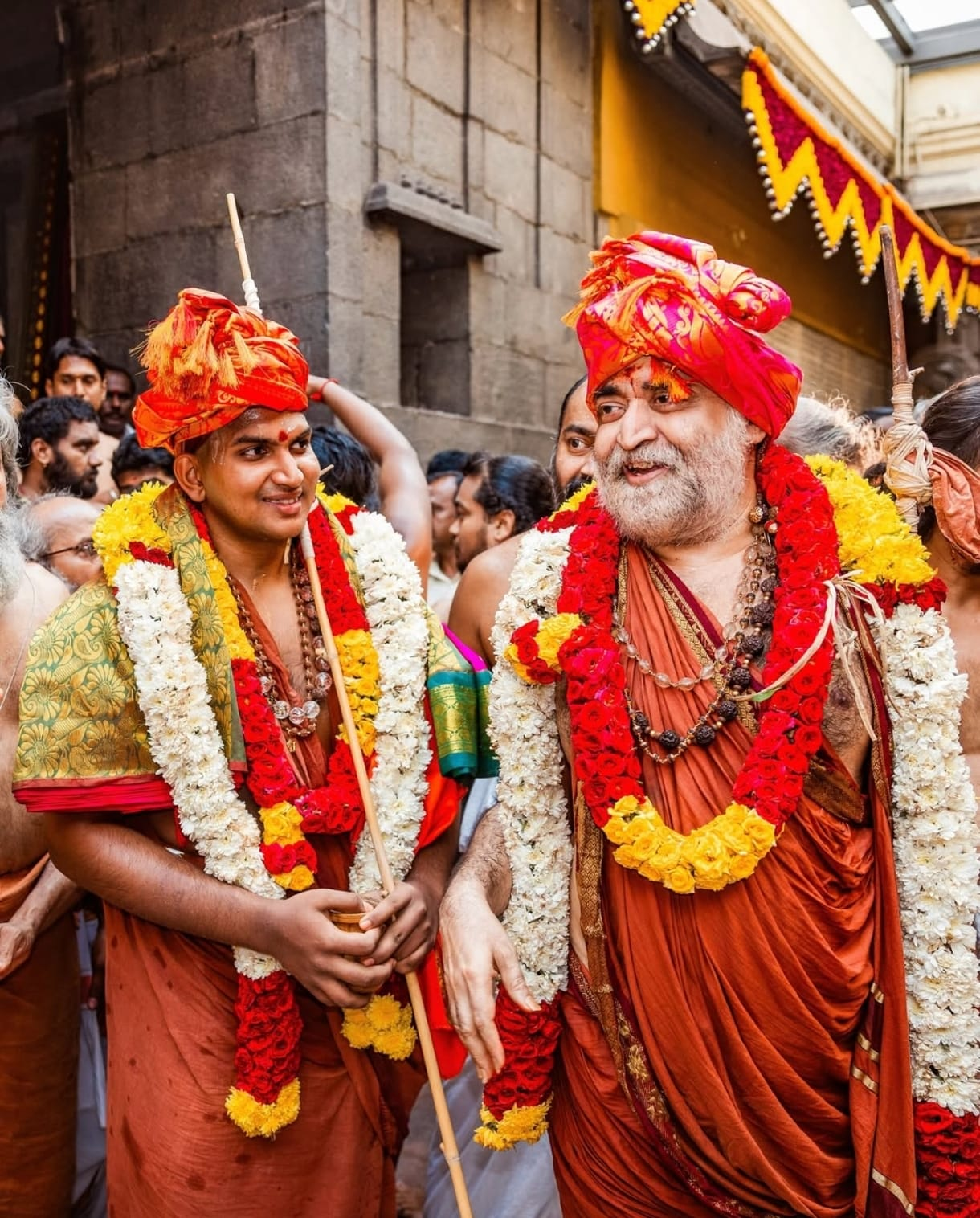
- Title: Kānchi Kāmakoti Pīṭham Uttarādhikāri

Personal life
- Born: Duddu Satya Venkata Surya Subrahmanya Ganesha Sharma Dravid; 29 April 1999 (age 27) Annavaram, Andhra Pradesh
- Honors: Shankaracharya
- Website: www.kamakoti.org

Religious life
- Philosophy: Advaitam
- Preceded by: Shankara Vijayendra Saraswathi

Satya Chandrashekharendra Saraswati Swamigal (Sanskrit: श्री सत्य चन्द्रशेखरेन्द्र सरस्वती, IAST: Śrī Satya Candraśekharendra Sarasvatī) is the junior pontiff and designated 71st Jagadguru Pīṭhādhipati of the Kanchi Kamakoti Peetham in Kanchipuram. He received Sannyasa Diksha from Vijayendra Saraswati, the 70th pontiff, on 30 April 2025.

== Early life ==
Satya Chandrashekharendra Saraswati was born in 1999 as Duddu Satya Venkata Surya Subrahmanya Ganesha Sharma Dravid in Annavaram village of Andhra Pradesh. At age six, Ganesha began rigorous Vedic studies, mastering the Rigveda under Ratnakara Bhattu at Dwaraka Tirumala temple, earning the title Salakshana Ghanapati for his expertise. By 2006, he was initiated into Vedic learning with the blessings of Vijayendra Saraswathi of the Kanchi Kamakoti Peetham, who supported his education.

Ganesha Sharma’s scholarly journey included mastering the Yajurveda, Samaveda, Shadangas, and Dashopanishads, alongside serving as a priest at Annavaram and Basara temples, where he became the Ashthana Rig Veda Pandit. In his early twenties, he moved to Kanchipuram to study Sanskrit, Shastras, and Tamil under Kanchi Mutt scholars, deepening his spiritual and linguistic prowess.

== Anointment ==
On April 30, 2025, during Akshaya Tritiya, he was anointed as 71st Shankaracharya of the Kanchi Kamakoti Peetham, receiving Sanyasa Deeksha and the honorific title Sri Satya Chandrashekharendra Saraswati, coinciding with Adi Shankara’s 2534th birth anniversary.

== Contributions ==
Religious titles
Preceded by
Vijayendra Saraswati
Kanchi Kāmakoti Uttaradhikari
Elected on: 30 April 2025

Next Peethathipathi
