= Mahadevendra Saraswati V =

67th Shankaracharya of the Kanchi matha

Mahadevendra Saraswati V was the 67th Peethadhishwar of the Kanchi matha.

== Life and times ==
Saraswathi was born as Lakshmikantan to Narasimha Sastri and Lakshmi in 1889. It is also said that he was named Lakshminarasimha (combining his parents' names).

He was given the title Mahadevendra Saraswati and made the Shankaracharya in 1907. He occupied the post for a brief period of seven days and died in 1907. He was succeeded by his first cousin, Swaminathan, a boy of thirteen, who became the sixty-eighth Shankaracharya with the title Chandrashekharendra Saraswati VIII.

He was in the service of his guru Sri Chandrashekharendra Saraswati VII who was the pontiff of the mutt from 1891. When he was offered the position of next Acharya after Chandrashekharendra Saraswati VII, Lakshmikantan who incidentally was a native of Thiruvisainallur, refused to become the Acharya, but preferred to be in the service of his guru wherever he goes. On hearing this, the guru was moved by his devotion and told that as his life coming to an end, let him accept the position till Swaminathan comes from Villupuram. After that, "I will call you to whichever place I will be in". Coincidentally, the moment Swaminathan entered Kalavai, Lakshmikantan, now known as Mahadevendra Saraswati V, attained siddhi and died of delirium, only 1 week after ascending the position as the Shankaracharya.

Sri Mahadevendra Saraswati's Samadhi is located in Kalavai, next to his Guru, Sri Chandrasekharendra Saraswati VII's samadhi. He was also struck by the same disease that caused the Siddhi of his Guru. He died within seven days of ascending the throne of the mutt. But before he died, he had sent word for Swaminathan to be his successor.

The next seer was Sri Chandrasekharendra Saraswati (‘Mahaperiyava’), the 68th seer of the Mutt. Jayendra Saraswathi was the 69th seer and was succeeded by Vijayendra Saraswathi as the 70th pontiff of the mutt. In May 2025, Vijayendra Saraswathi Swami was anointed the 71st Acharya.

Preceded by Chandrasekharendra Saraswati VII	67th Shankaracharya of Kanchi; 6 February 1907– 13 February 1907	Succeeded by Chandrasekharendra Saraswati VIII
