= Govindapuram, Thanjavur =

Govindapuram
- village
- Location in Tamil Nadu, India Govindapuram (India)
- Coordinates: 10.97°N 79.47°E
- Country: India
- State: Tamil Nadu
- District: Thanjavur
- Taluk: Thiruvidaimarudur

Languages
  - Official: Tamil
- Time zone: UTC+5:30 (IST)

Govindapuram is a village in the Thiruvidaimarudur taluk of Thanjavur district in Tamil Nadu, India. It is situated at a distance of 7 kilometres from Kumbakonam and 27 kilometres from Mayiladuthurai and 1 kilometre from Thiruvidaimarudur. It is said this is named after the minister Govinda Dikshita of Raghunatha Nayaka who ruled Thanjavur in 17th century.

== Demographics ==
As per the 2001 census, Govindapuram had a population of 2,231 with 1,117 men and 1,114 women. The sex ratio was 997. The literacy rate was 86.29. There are a total of 516 households.

== Historical significance ==
Govindapuram is the final abode of Kanchi Shankaracharya Bodhendra Saraswathi whose samadhi is located here. The samadhi is maintained by the Kanchi mutt. Govindapuram is also the centre of Sri Vittal Rukmini Samsthan which has constructed a temple to the Hindu god Vittal in this village.
