= Tiruvallam Bhaskaran Nair =

Tiruvallam Bhaskaran Nair (born G. Bhaskaran Nair) is a 20th-century Malayalam poet known for his Malayalam translation of the ancient Indian philosophical text of Tirukkural, among other Tamil, Sanskrit and English works. Nair translated only the first of the three books of the Kural text, and the translation was made in prose. The Sankaracharya of Kanchi has felicitated him as 'Kavyavallabhan'.

== Translation of the Kural text ==
Bhaskaran Nair translated the first book (the book of Aram) of the Tirukkural into Malayalam and published it in 1962 at Trivandrum under the title Bhasha Tirukkural (Dharmakandam). It included the original Tamil verses and a Malayalam commentary on the couplets.

== Quotations ==
According to Bhaskaran Nair, "Thirukkural begins where Bhagawat Gita exited," and "Tirukkural is not a matter for discussion or discourses as it remains to dismiss discussion and discourses."

In his letter to K. Kamaraj, the then chief minister of the Madras State, dated 30 August 1959, Nair further stated,

When I started making a deep and detailed study of Tirukkural I was really startled to herald a new World in it—a world that I have never had seen. As unable to bear or withstand its powerful light that struck against me I closed the book as one closes his eyes against the powerful Sun. I pondered over this, days and nights, with mixed feelings. Opening the book again I, from a distance, examined a few further lines. Spiritualism involved in the extremity of science is found anywhere in the book as the sun found reflected anywhere in the ocean or a clear body of water.

== See also ==
- Tirukkural translations
- Tirukkural translations into Malayalam
- List of translators
