= Vyasachala Mahadevendra Saraswati =

54th pontiff of the Kanchi Kamakoti Peetham

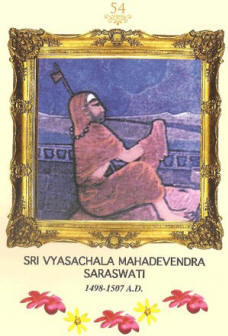
Image of Vyasachala Mahadevendra Saraswati

According to the Kanchi Kamakoti Peetham tradition, Vyasachala Mahadevendra Saraswati was its 54th Pontiff from 1498 to 1507AD. He was the son of Kamesvara and Kamalamba who belonged to Kanchi. His pre-sanyasa name was Kuppanna and his guru was Purnananda Sadasivendra Saraswati. He is the author of Vyasachala Sankara Vijaya. He attained mukti at Vyasachala on the first day of the dark fortnight of Ashada in the cyclic year Akshaya (1507 AD). The Acharyal has been described as great tapasvi and besmeared with holy vibhuthi and engaged himself in Shiva aradhana. The jeeva samadhi of Vyasachala Mahadevendra Saraswati is located in Sri Nallinaikeshwarar temple Ezhichur which is 55 km from Chennai. The Shiva Linga was worshipped by Surya and Chandra Bhagavan. There is a temple pond which was created by Surya Bhagavan for worshipping Lord Nallinakeshwarar. It's said that 7 Siddhas pray to the Shiva Linga in the form of snakes and one who is steeped in devotion can have the good fortune of having darshan of them. Acharyal Vyasachala Mahadevendra Saraswati attained videha mukti and went into Agni Mudra through which he was immediately transformed to sacred vibhuthi. It's said that one should chant Pancaksara Mantra with devotion to have darshan of the acharya in person or through speech or visions. The sacred vibhuthi provided by the priest should be only used during the evening and one should take care not to commit any aparadha or any sin. After his mukti, the disciplic succession was carried over by Chandrachudhendra Saraswati II,
