= Sankararaman murder case =

Sankaracharjya blame for murder case

The Sankararaman murder case concerned the murder of Sankararaman, the manager of the Varadharaja Perumal Temple in Kanchipuram, a town in the state of Tamil Nadu. He was murdered on the temple premises on 3 September 2004. The Shankaracharya of the Kanchi Mutt, Jayendra Saraswathi, and his designated successor Vijayendra Saraswati were accused of involvement in the killing. In November 2004, the leader of the opposition, M. Karunanidhi, said that although he had initially welcomed Jayendra Saraswathi's arrest he had come to "strongly feel that it could be due to personal enmity", and that there was "personal vengeance and motives" behind the way the arrest had been handled.

The report by investigative journalist Dhamodaran Prakash in the Tamil weekly Nakkeeran and the confession by the surrendered, lead to the arrest of Jayendra Saraswati and Vijayendra Saraswati, the seers of the Kanchi Mutt, a popular South Indian monastic institution. Sankararaman is alleged to have constantly leveled accusations against the Kanchi seers and the functioning of the Kanchi Mutt. The victim responsible for the arrest of the Jayendra Saraswati is alleged to have sent anonymous letters to the Mutt in his own name and his pen name Somasekara Ganapadigal alleging instances of financial irregularities and nepotism.

The trial involved examining 189 witnesses during the trial period of 2009 to 2013, out of which 89 turned hostile. On 27 November 2013, all the 24 accused were acquitted by the Puducherry Principal District Session, quoting lack of incriminating evidence against them. The Puducherry court that pronounced the verdict on the trial noted that fair and proper trial was not performed in the case in the investigation, especially due to the active involvement of SP of Kanchipuram Premkumar IPS in the case beyond what is specified by law against Shankaracharya. It is to be noted that the SP was later convicted for his misuse of power

== Background ==
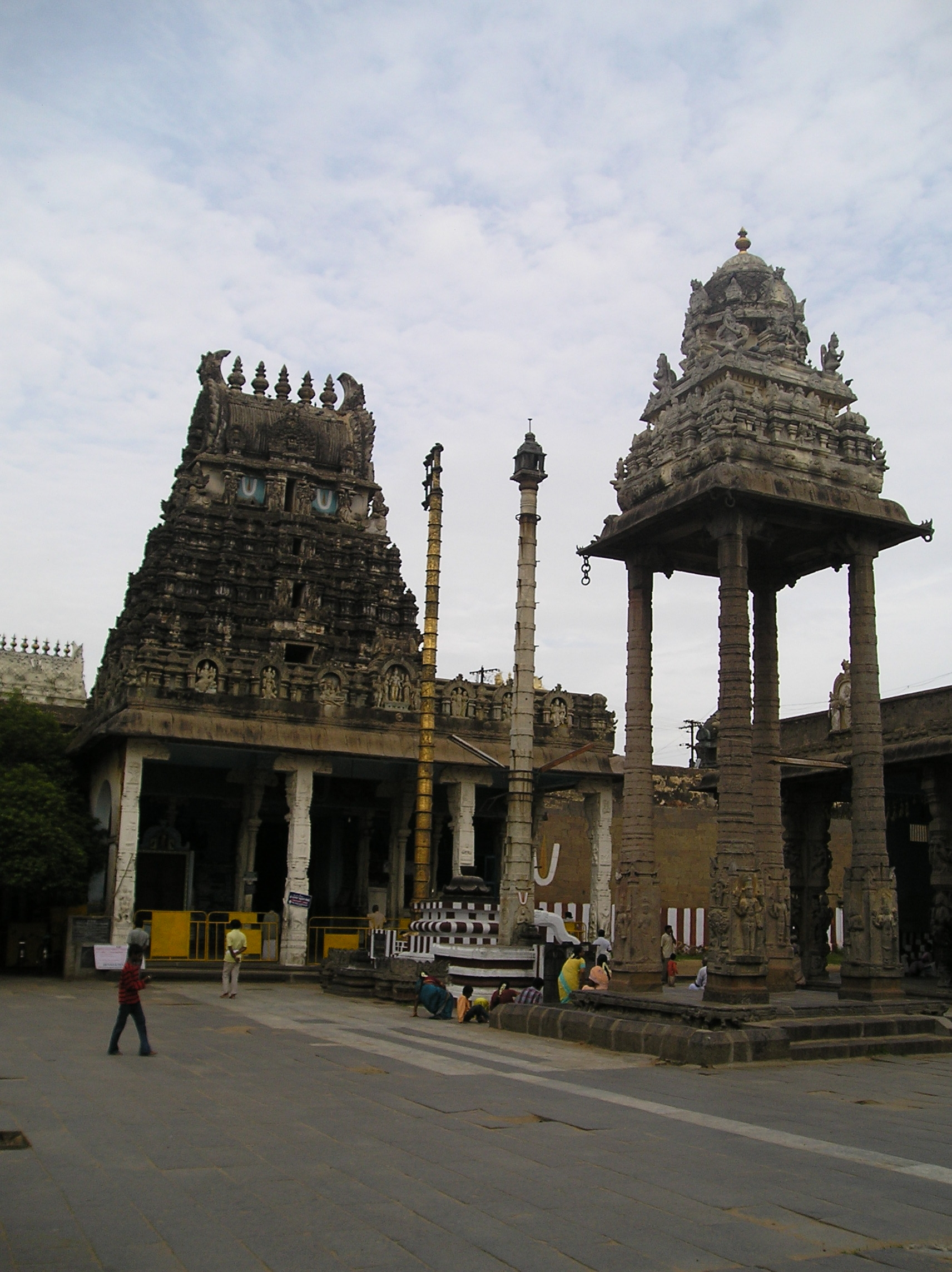
Varadharaja Perumal temple, where Sankarraman was murdered

Sankararaman was the manager of Varadharaja Perumal Temple in Kanchipuram, a town in the South Indian state of Tamil Nadu. Sankararaman constantly leveled accusations against the Kanchi seers and the functioning of the Kanchi Mutt. He is alleged to have sent anonymous letters to the Mutt. His father, Anantakrishnasharma was working closely with the 68th seer, Chandrasekarendra Saraswathi, the predecessor of Sri Jayendra Saraswathi. Sankararaman was an employee of the Mutt until the demise of Chandrasekarendra Saraswati in 1994. He detached himself from the mutt when Jayendra Saraswathi became the head of the Mutt and he joined the Varadaraja Perumal temple as a manager. He was reported to be a stickler of tradition and he streamlined the assets and income of the temple. He suspended two of the temple priests when there was a robbery in the temple and refused to allow them until they paid the loss of ₹105,000. He made the tenants and land leasers of the temple pay the arrears amount. He filed a case in a court in 2000, against Jayendra Saraswathi visiting China, quoting that the seers of the Mutt cannot cross ocean, but can take land route. Jayendra Saraswathi cancelled the trip eventually. He was allegedly once not allowed to enter the Kamakshi Amman Temple along with his family in 2001 by the Mutt authorities.

Sankararaman was murdered by a set of five gang men on 3 September 2004 in the premises of the temple using sharp weapons. While there were no eyewitnesses to the murder, the perpetrators presumably visited the house of Sankararaman an hour before to enquire about his whereabouts. His daughter, as per her statement in the court, revealed the incident.

== Key accused ==
Jayendra Saraswathi Swamigal was the head of the Kanchi Mutt, one of a prominent Hindu monastic institutions in the country. An investigative journalist named Dhamodaran Prakash in the Tamil weekly Nakkeeran alleged the reasons of the murder being the continuous infuriation by Sankararaman against Jayendrar and Kanchi Mutt. His report claimed that the letters were denting the image of the seer and the Mutt against prospective sponsors of the mutt. The report, which claimed that the murder was done at the behest of the seer and the confessions of some of accused who surrendered earlier brought Jayendrar into the spectrum of the case and necessitated his arrest.

Jayendra Saraswathi and Vijayendra Saraswathi were named as accused number one (A-1), and A-2 respectively. Appu alias Krishnaswamy was accused of utilizing his gang men for the murder of Sankararaman. Appu is believed to be associated with politicians from major parties and his criminal records have sandalwood smuggling and sand quarrying charges. He was arrested twice during 1996-2001 for those charges but was released immediately. Before the murder, he had nine pending cases against his name that included one murder and three attempts to murder. It was alleged that Appu directed five gang men to murder Sankararaman. Ravi Subramanian, a civil contractor who constructed buildings related to the Kanchi Mutt was alleged to have arranged Appu for the murder. Sundaresa Ayyar, the manager of the mutt for several years was added as an accused in the case as he was alleged to have arranged the funds for the murder from the Mutt accounts. A total of 24 people were accused in the case.

== Arrests ==
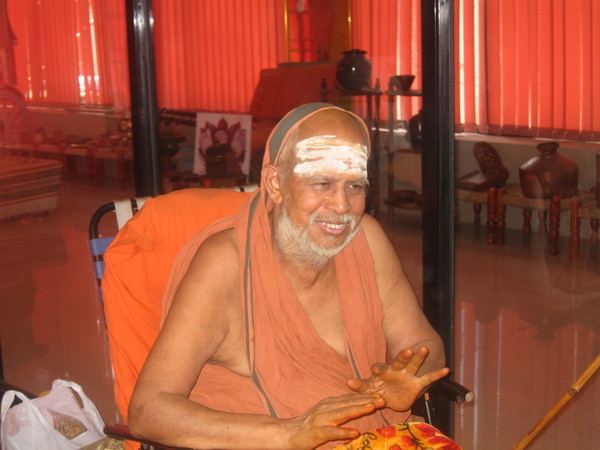
Jayendra Saraswathi, the Acharya (head and guru) of the Kanchi Mutt and one of the accused in the case

The case involved the arrest of Jayendra Saraswati and Vijayendra Saraswati, the seers of the Kanchi Mutt, a monastic institution claimed to be established by Sri Adishankara. Jayendra was arrested on the Diwali day of 11 November 2004 at around 11:25 p.m. in Andhra Pradesh, while Vijayendra Saraswathi was arrested on the Mutt premises on 10 January 2005. Both the seers were in Mahabubnagar in Andhra Pradesh when the warrant was issued and the Tamil Nadu Police reached Hyderabad. Jayendra Saraswathi was arrested and brought to Hyderabad airport from where he was brought to Chennai. 12 men including Jayendra, were arrested in the case and five others surrendered in front of the George Town court. One of them confessed that he surrendered as ₹50,000 was paid to him for the surrender and the police arrested six men who arranged for the surrender. Appu was arrested on 11 November 2004 in Andhra Pradesh in connection with the case. Sundaresa Ayyar, the manager of the Kanchi Mutt was arrested in December 2004.

== Alleged confession ==
Senior Supreme Court lawyer KTS Tulsi claimed in court that the Jayendra Saraswati in tears, admitted to his role in the murder of Sankararaman from 19 to 21 November 2004 at an All Women's police station, Kanchipuram.

== Chargesheet ==
The then Superintendent of Police K Premkumar who made the arrest and S P Sakthivelu, who was the investigating officer, submitted an 1875-page charge sheet before the Judicial Magistrate of Chingalpet. The charge sheet, filed on 21 January 2005, named 24 people accused in the case. There were separate charge sheets filed against Jayendrar and Vijayendrar who were the prime accused in the case. It named 377 witnesses in the case and provided 722 documents related to the case. The submission of charge sheet in the case enabled the trial to begin. Ravi Subramanian, who was a civil contractor and co-accused in the case turned an approver, and he was included as a prosecution witness. He mentioned that the arrest of Jayendrar was done based on the confession from Kathiravan, who was charged as accused number 6 in the case.

== Trial ==
Final Judgement

"Neither substantial nor reliable evidence is available on record to corroborate the testimony of hostile witnesses or evidence of prosecution witnesses, who conducted the identification parade to fix the identification of the accused. No incriminating evidence is available against the accused. Material objects seized from the accused are not proved,"

— ~ Justice CS Murugan,Sankararaman Murder: Kanchi Seers, Others Acquitted, 27 November 2013

Jayendra Saraswati was produced in judicial magistrate court in Kanchipuram, and was jailed Vellore Central Prison on 12 November 2004. Kanchipuram judicial magistrate extended his judicial custody until 10 December 2004 on 26 November 2004. After four days the prosecution claimed that Jayendra Saraswati "admitted to his involvement" in the murder of Sankararaman.

The bail plea of Jayendrar was declined in lower court and also in Madras High Court in December 2005. Jayendrar was released on bail on 10 January 2005, after two months of his arrest, by an order of the Supreme Court of India, which condemned the Tamil Nadu Police for not gathering credible evidence against the seer. The court also issued a notice to the Government of Tamil Nadu seeking explanation on detaining Krishnaswamy, one of the key accused in the case and not allowing him to be granted bail. The court also condemned the SP Premkumar for showing "undue interest and active participation" beyond his stated jurisdiction. Jayendrar was asked by the court not to visit the Mutt premises until the chargesheet was filed by the police. The Tamil Nadu government also filed a petition to the Supreme Court that the accused shall not reside in Tamil Nadu, Karnataka, Andhra Pradesh and Pondicherry during the course of investigation of the trial, but the petition was dismissed. Vijayendrar was released on bail by the Madras High Court on 11 February 2005, with a personal bond for ₹50,000 and two sureties.

Witness under duress

"Out of the 181 prosecution witnesses, 84 turned hostile and this shows that they were under duress to give evidence"

— ~ Justice CS Murugan,Kanchi Seer absolved in Mutt murder, 27 November 2013

The trial was initially planned in Chengalpet court. But, the seers appealed in the Supreme Court of India against the conduct of trial in the state citing political reasons and doubting fair trial. Sankarraman's widow opposed it by quoting that the 375 witnesses were all from Tamil Nadu and the legal documents were all written in Tamil. On 27 March 2007, the court ordered the case to be shifted to the neighbouring Union Territory, Pondicherry.

The trial began on 28 November 2007 in the principal sessions court in Pondicherry amidst tight security. Jayendrar also filed a special leave petition in the Supreme Court on 22 July 2008, challenging the continuance of Public prosecutor appointed by the Tamil Nadu government in the Puducherry court. The court reserved its orders on transfer of the case to Puducherry on his petition in March 2007. The Supreme Court ordered the Puducherry government to appoint a public prosecutor in the case, following which, a senior lawyer, N Devadoss was appointed by the Puduchery government to handle the case. The case was the first of its kind in the legal history of Puducherry when a case was transferred to the Union Territory. Kathiravan, one of the 24 accused was murdered on 5 March 2013 by five gang men in his houses in KK Nagar in Chennai. A Trichy-based lottery businessman with whom Kathiravan was involved in a land grab issue, was allegedly found to be the reason of the murder.

The trial involved examining 189 witnesses during the trial period of 2009 to 2013, out of which 89 turned hostile. The trial also saw four judges handling the case. On 27 November 2013, all the 24 accused were acquitted by the Puducherry Principal District Session, quoting lack of incriminating evidence against them. One among the 24, M Kathiravan, a prime accused, was hacked to death by a five-member gang near his house on 24 March 2013, was also acquitted. The judge in his order, pronounced that the witnesses including the daughter of Sankararam failed to identify the accused in the court.

The Puducherry court that pronounced the verdict on the trial noted that fair and proper trial was not performed in the case by the investigation officer due to the active involvement of SP Premkumar in the case beyond what is specified law. The court noted the same statements used by the Supreme Court against the SP when it granted bail to the seer during 2005. After opinion from Attorney-General Mukul Rohatgi to the central Home ministry, the Puducherry government reversed its decision to file an appeal on the case.

== Political background ==
Arrest of the seer

"Everyone is equal before the law. When the trial takes place, the truth will come out. This is one of the most painful decisions I had to take in my entire political career. It was not a decision that I have taken happily as this was not the decision that I wanted to take. But circumstances have compelled me to do my duty. I am doing my duty"

— Seer's arrest 'most painful' decision: Jayalalithaa, PTI, 30 November 2004

J Jayalalithaa, the leader of the All India Anna Dravida Munnetra Kazhagam (AIADMK) and then Chief Minister of Tamil Nadu, was an ardent follower of the Shankaracharya and the Mutt. The last meeting between the seer and her had been reported on 11 August 2003, in the premises of the Mutt, when Sushil Kumar Shinde, the Maharashtra Chief Minister, was also paying a visit to the seer. The arrest of the Hindu seer in the case was seen as a political mileage for Jayalalithaa to improve her secular image with the Indian National Congress, who were otherwise part of the alliance of the opposing Dravida Munnetra Kazhagam. Kavi Tejpal Singh Tulsi, the senior Supreme Court advocate in the case criticized Jayendra Saraswati's supporters saying "for them a Brahmin is above the law" and said that Jayalalitha allowed the law to take its own course and did not engineer the case. He said that the Seer's food was cooked by a Brahmin constable in the prison and allegations about his mistreatment in the jail are wild and not true. Another account claimed that Appu, one of the prime accused was working under Arcot N. Veeraswami, one of the leaders of the DMK. The seer's association with Appu, an opposition party member, is also believed to have effected in the fallout.

Following the arrest of the seer, former prime minister Atal Bihari Vajpayee, former president R. Venkataraman and leaders from different political parties held a protest in New Delhi condemning the arrest while the DMK party chief M. Karunanidhi welcomed the arrest and appreciated Tamil Nadu police however, he soon changed his stance, saying he had come to "strongly feel that it could be due to personal enmity" and that there was "personal vengeance and motives" behind the manner of the arrest. Vajpayee met Prime Minister Manmohan Singh and asked that Saraswathi be moved to "some decent guest house". The Bharatiya Janata Party and the Sangh Parivar, which have been waging a battle against the seer's arrest with their "Hinduism under threat" slogan failed to create any significant response. There was very little public response except Brahmin groups performing yagnas and lighting lamps. The then Prime Minister Manmohan Singh advised the state government to handle the case with care, considering the political tension surrounding it. The Vishwa Hindu Parishad (VHP) organised a nationwide bandh to protest the arrest. The Democratic Progressive Alliance made massive demonstrations in many areas of the State to protest against the BJP's attempt to communalise Saraswati's arrest.

The AIADMK government led by Jayalalithaa was defeated (61/248 seats) in the 2006 Tamil Nadu assembly elections in spite of alliance with DMDK, a strong contender even till 2026. The arrest of the Kanchi seer was viewed as a major factor in this defeat, particularly due to the perceived anti-Hindu sentiment and the fallout with the Brahmin community and other devout Hindus. This shows that public in Tamil Nadu may not react but they do respond.

== Impact on Kanchi Mutt ==
The Kanchi Mutt is seen as one of the prominent institutions of Hinduism and claims to have been established by Adi Sankara in 5th century BC. The Mutt was an element of criticism for the Dravidian parties in the state that espouse Periyar's ideologies. It got national prominence with the involvement of Jayendra in the Ayodhya issue. Following the arrest of the seer, all the 194 bank accounts of the Mutt were sealed as police believed that the murder was funded by these bank accounts. The Mutt operated temporarily out of Kalavai, following the release of Jayendra on bail.

The Madras High Court ruled against the Tamil Nadu Police on 11 January 2005, quoting "No one is above the law. But if you divert and deviate from that direction unmindful of the rights of innocent devotees of the Mutt, it would result not only in diluting the prosecution, but also cast a deep shadow on it. If there is anything wrong with the administration of the Mutt, it is for the Hindu Religious & Charitable Endowments Department which has to comply with the procedure under the Act and to look after the said issues in terms of the provisions of the Act and it is not for the police to interfere with the functions of the Mutt while investigating a case of murder or assault."

Several cases were also filed against the supporters of Kanchi Seers in this case including Gurumurthy who were writing articles and questioning Government's motive behind this case. Eventually, all of those cases against Gurumurthy were dismissed as baseless.
