= Tirukkural translations into Malayalam =

Malayalam has seen the most number of Tirukkural translations than that of any other language in India. As of 2007, there are at least 21 translations of the Kural text available in Malayalam. Malayalam also has the distinction of producing the first ever translation of the Kural text among the languages in India and the world at large. The Annual Report of the Cochin Archeological Department for the year 1933–34 reported an unpublished manuscript of a Malayalam translation of the Tirukkural made in 1595.

== History of translations ==
=== Background ===
Malayalam translations of the Kural text range from old Malayalam to modern Malayalam. With the Malayalam language tracing its origin in old Tamil, both old Malayalam and modern Malayalam have a rich vocabulary of both Tamil and Sanskrit origin. Kerala had a long and enduring connection with the Tamil region and culture since antiquity, which flourished during the Chera Dynasty. For centuries, Tamil remained the educational and administrative language of Kerala, with Malayalam being the language of the common people. The salutary influence of the Tamil literature on early Malayalam literature was more pronounced during the 12th and the 13th centuries, with the pattu style of literature being a significant example of this influence. Until the 19th century, educated people of Kerala studied Tamil as a second language, and scholars had studied important Tamil classics such as the Tirukkural, Chilappathikaram, and Kamba Ramayanam. However, these were considered as part of the common heritage, and there was no serious attempt to translate these into Malayalam, until at least the late 16th century.

=== Beginning of translations ===
The first Malayalam translation of the Kural text, and the very first translation of the Kural text into any language, appeared in 1595. Written by an unknown author, it was titled Tirukkural Bhasha and was a prose rendering of the entire Kural, written closely to the spoken Malayalam of that time. However, the manuscript remained unpublished and was first reported by the Annual Report of the Cochin Archeological Department for the year 1933–34. This has not been printed. The first modern translation appeared in 1875 when the work was translated in verse by Azhakathu Kurup and published in Trivandrum. In 1899, a translation was published by Dewan Bahadur A. Govinda Pillai, a judge of the erstwhile Travancore State High Court. He was a translator and versifier who had translated Shakespearean works into Malayalam. This translation is not available now.

In 1957, two translations of the Kural were published in Malayalam. The first one was by Sasthamangalam Ramakrishna Pillai of Trivandrum. Although he completed the translation with a comprehensive commentary and notes in 1933, he published it only in September 1957 with abridged commentary under the title "Ramakrishna Tirukkural." Ramakrishna chose a short metre similar to the original Kural, reflecting the epigrammatic qualities of the original. The second one was by Malayalam poet Vennikkulam Gopala Kurup, who started studying the Kural 25 years ago and learning Tamil in the process, and translated the work with the help of Pandit E. V. Raman Nambudiri of the Oriental Manuscript Library, Trivandrum. The completed work with commentary was published in December 1957 by the Writers Co-operative Society in Kottayam. Unlike Ramakrishna Pillai, who translated the Kural in a "tight verse" form, Vennikkulam Kurup employed three different metres for the three parts, making it more comprehensive to the average reader without the aid of a commentary.

Several translations started appearing ever since, both partial and complete, including those by P. Damodaran Pillai (1951), Tiruvallam G. Bhaskaran Nair (1962), K. Chellan Nadar (1962), G. Balakrishnan Nair (1963), M. R. R. Variar (2003), Ramesan Nair (in old Malayalam), V. V. Abdulla Sahib (2002, verse translation), K. G. Chandrasekaran Nair (2003, prose translation), and Shailaja Ravindran (2007).

In 2022, as part of its Ancient Tamil Classics in Translations series, the Central Institute of Classical Tamil (CICT) in Chennai released its Malayalam translation of the Kural by N. Manoharan.

== Translations ==
Translation	Chapter 26, മാംസാഹാരം	
Translation	Kural 254 (Couplet 26:4)	Kural 258 (Couplet 26:8)
V. V. Abdulla Sahib, 2002	കൊല്ലായ്ക ദയവായീടും ജീവഹത്യ വിരുദ്ധമാം; ഹത്യയാൽ ലഭ്യമാമന്നം ഭുജിക്കുന്നതധർമ്മമാം	ഉയിരുള്ള ശരീരത്തിൽ നിന്നു വേർപ്പെട്ട ഭാഗമാം പിണമായുള്ള മാംസത്തെ ഭുജിക്കാ വിജ്ഞരായവർ

== See also ==
- Tirukkural translations
- List of Tirukkural translations by language

== Published translations ==
- Tiruvallam Bhaskaran Nair (Trans.). (1962). Bhasha Tirukkural (Dharmakandam) (Series 2). Trivandrum, India: Arul Nilayam. 197 pages. Available from http://sreyasfoundation.org/bhasha-thirukkural-thiruvallam/
- K. G. Chandrasekaran Nair (Trans.). (2003). Thirukkural [Prose translation into Malayalam]. Kottayam, India: D. C. Books.
- Abdulla Sahib, V. V. (2002). Thirukkural (Malayalam). Printed at Gupta Press, 123, Periyar Street, Erode–638 001, Tamil Nadu.
- M. R. R. Variar (Trans.). (2003). Thirukkural. India:399 pages.
- S. Ramesan Nair (Trans.). (2008). തിരുക്കുറള്‍ (Thirukkural). Kottayam, India: D. C. Books. 805 pages.

== Bibliography ==
- Neela Padhmanaban. (2000). இரமேசன் நாயரின் 'திருக்குறள்' மலையாள மொழியாக்கம்: சில சிந்தனைகள். [Ramesan Nair’s ‘Tirukkural’: Malayalam translation. Some thoughts]. வள்ளுவம். பல்லடம் மாணிக்கம் திருக்குறள் பண்பாட்டு ஆய்வு மையம்.
- Kunhikrishan, K. (1999). Tirukkural in Malayalam. Book Review of Tirukkural translation in Malayalam by S. Ramesan Nair. In: The Hindu.
