= Vijayendra Saraswati Swamigal =

Seventieth and current Head of Sri Kanchi Kamakoti Peetam

His Holiness Moolamnaya Sarvajna Peethadipathi Jagadguru Shankaracharya Sri Shankara Vijayendra Saraswati Mahaswamigal
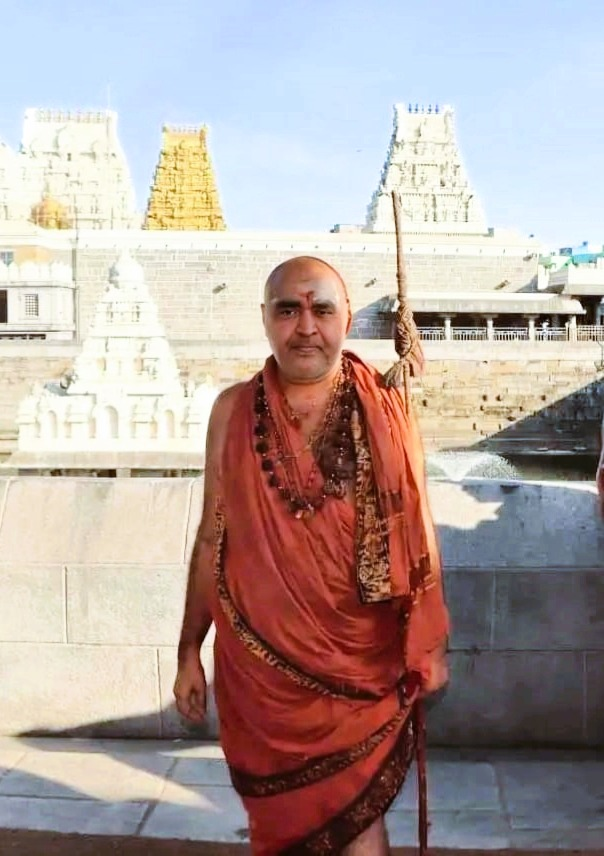
- Jagadguru Shankaracharya Sri Shankara Vijayendra Saraswati Mahaswamigal
- Title: Moolamnaya Sarvajna Shri Kānchi Kāmakoti Pīṭhādhipati

Personal life
- Born: Sankara Narayanan; 13 March 1969 (age 57) thandalam, Tiruvallur
- Honors: Peethadishwar
- Website: www.kamakoti.org

Religious life
- Religion: Hinduism

Kanchi Kāmakoti Pīṭhādipati
- Incumbent
- Assumed office 28 Feb 2018
- Preceded by: Jayendra Saraswati
- Succeeded by: Satya Chandrashekharendra Saraswati

Jagadguru Shankaracharya Sri Shankara Vijayendra Saraswathi Mahaswamigal (born 13 March 1969) is the 70th Jagadguru Shankaracharya of Moolamnaya Sarvajna Shri Kanchi Kamakoti Peetham, Kanchipuram. He became the Peetadhipathi of the Moolamnaya Sarvajna Shri Kanchi Kamakoti Peetham following the Videha mukti of Sri Jayendra Saraswati, the 69th Pontiff, on 28 February 2018.

== Biography ==
Sri Shankara Vijayendra Saraswathi was born in 1969 as Sankara Narayanan Sastri in Periyapalayam village near Arani in Tiruvallur. He attended a village school in Periyapalayam and studied the Vedas with his father, Sri Krishnamurthy Sastri, a Vedic scholar and teacher. He joined the Kanchi Kamakoti Peetham when he was 13 and was named 70th Peethadhipati in 1983.

== Arrest and acquittal ==
Vijayendra Saraswati was named as the second accused in the Sankararaman murder case, concerning the killing of a temple official in September 2004. He was arrested at the Kanchi Mutt premises on 10 January 2005; the senior pontiff, Jayendra Saraswathi, had been arrested two months earlier, on 11 November 2004. On 27 November 2013, the Puducherry Principal District and Sessions Court acquitted all 24 accused, including both pontiffs, citing a lack of incriminating evidence.

Religious titles
Preceded by
Jayendra Saraswati
Kanchi Kāmakoti Pīṭhādhipati
Elected on: 1983
Succeeded on: 28 February 2018.

Current Peethathipathi        

Succeeded by
Satya Chandrashekharendra Saraswati
