= Chandrashekharendra Saraswati VIII =

68th Peethadishwar of Kanchi Kamakoti Peetham

Moolamnaya Sarvajna Peethadipathi Jagadguru Shankaracharya Sri Chandrasekharendra Saraswati (VIII) Mahaswamigal Mahaswamigal, Mahaperiyava, Shankaracharya
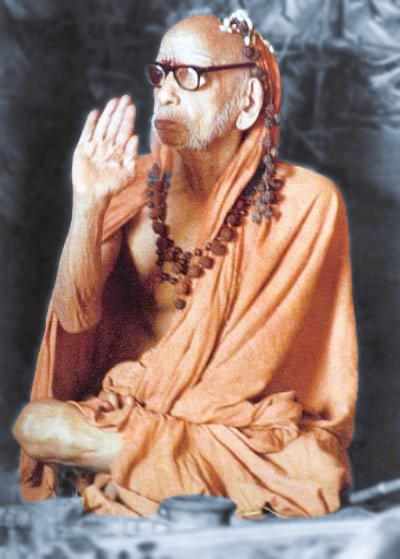
- 68th Jagadguru Shankaracharya of the Moolamnaya Sarvajna Shri Kanchi Kamakoti Peetham

Personal life
- Born: Swaminathan Shasthri; 20 May 1894 Villupuram
- Died: 8 January 1994 (aged 99) Kanchipuram, Tamil Nadu, India
- Resting place: Kanchi Kamakoti Peetham

Religious life
- Religion: Hinduism
- Order: Daśanāmi Sampradaya
- Philosophy: Advaita Vedanta
- Ordination: 9 May 1907
- Consecration: 13 February 1907

Moolamnaya Sarvajna Shri Kanchi Kamakoti Peetham
- In office 1907–1994
- Preceded by: Mahadevendra Saraswati V
- Succeeded by: Jayendra Saraswati

Jagadguru Shri Chandrasekharendra Saraswati Shankaracharya Mahaswamigal (born in a Kannada Smartha family as Swaminathan Shasthri; 20 May 1894 – 8 January 1994) also known as the Sage of Kanchi or Mahaperiyava (meaning, "The great elder") was the 68th Jagadguru Shankaracharya of the Moolamnaya Saravjna Kanchi Kamakoti Peetham. His discourses have been recorded in a Tamil book titled "Deivathin Kural" (Voice of God).

== Early life ==
Jagadguru Shri Chandrasekharendra Saraswati Mahaswamigal (born Swaminathan Shasthri) was born on 20 May 1894. He was brought up in the central part of the southern state of Tamil Nadu, Villupuram, South Arcot District. He was born in a Kannada-speaking Hoysala Karnataka Brahmin family that had migrated to Tamil Nadu generations earlier. His father Subrahmanya Sastri worked as a teacher. His mother Mahalakshmi was also from a Kannada Brahmin family from the village of Eachangudi near Tiruvaiyaru. Swaminathan was the second child of his parents. His younger brother later became the great yogi Sivan SAR.

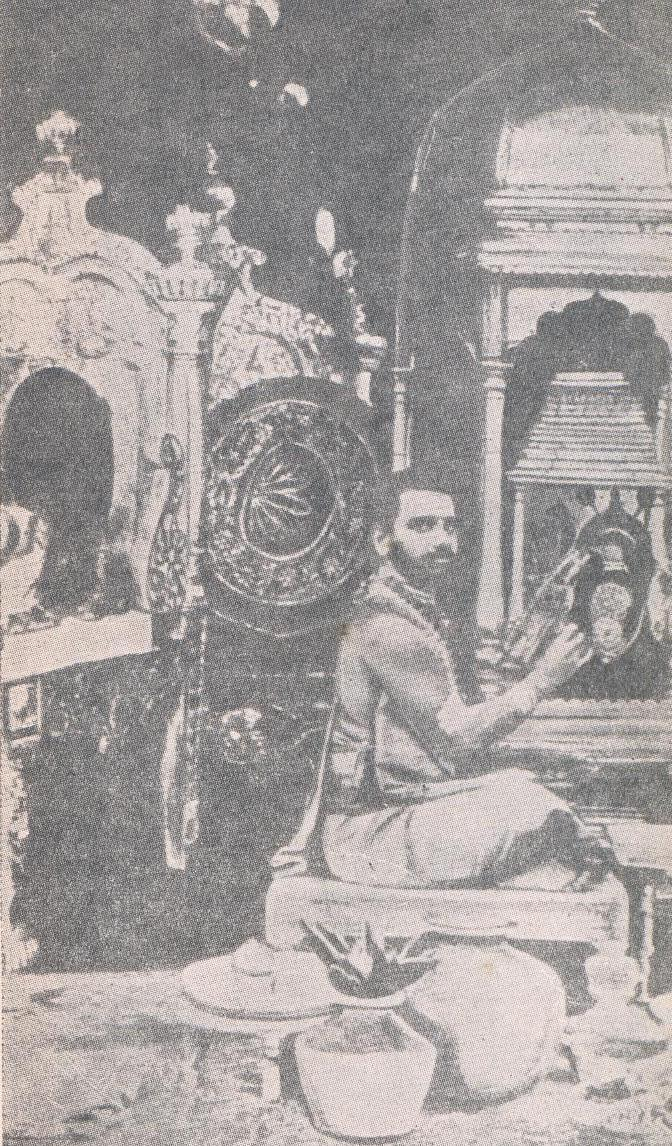
Chandrashekharendra Saraswati in 1933

Swaminathan's upanayanam was performed in Tindivanam in 1905 and it was during his upbringing that he became well versed in the Vedas and started performing pujas. In 1906 the 66th Acharya of Kamakoti Pitha, Sri Chandrasekharendra Saraswati VI, was camping in Perumukkal, a small village near Tindivanam in observance of the Chaturmasya vrata. The 66th Acharya attained siddhi and died in Kalavai, only 1 week after ascending the position and Swaminathan's maternal cousin was installed as the 67th Acharya. The 67th Acharya had a fever, attained siddhi and died. Due to the unexpected turn of events, Swaminathan was installed as the next Acharya. Swaminathan ascended the Kanchi Kamakoti Peetham on Paraabhava Tamil Year Maasi Tamil Month Moolam Star in the year 1907 (13 February 1907) as the 68th Acharya with the Sannyasashrama nama Chandrasekharendra Saraswati.

He was well-trained in the Vedas, Puranas, various Hindu texts and ancient Indian literature. The Acharya was fifteen years old in 1909. For two years he studied under the pandits of the Matha at Kumbakonam. From 1911 to 1914 he studied in Mahendramangalam, a tiny village on the Northern bank of Akhanda Kaveri. The Acharya showed interest in subjects such as photography, mathematics and astronomy. He returned to Kumbakonam in 1914. The Court of Wards managed the Matha (or mutt) from 1911 to 1915 until he turned twenty-one in May 1915.

I had a bath at the Kumara Koshta Thirtha. A carriage of the Mutt had come there from Kalavai with the people to buy articles for the Maha Puja on the tenth day of the passing of the previous 66th Acharya. One of them, a hereditary maistry (mason) of the Mutt, asked me to accompany him. A separate cart was engaged for the rest of the family to follow me. During the journey, the maistry hinted to me that I might not return home and that the rest of my life might be spent in the Mutt itself. At first, I thought that my elder cousin had become the Head of the Mutt, it was his wish that I should live with him. But the maistry gradually clarified matters as the cart rolled on. The Acharya had a fever which developed into delirium and that was why I was separated from the family to be taken to Kalavai. I was stunned by this unexpected turn of events. I lay in a kneeling posture in the cart, shocked as I was, repeating “Rama… Rama,” the only prayer I knew. My mother and other children came sometime later only to find that instead of her mission of consoling her sister, she was placed in the state of having to be consoled. — Jagadguru Shri Chandrasekharendra Saraswati Shankaracharya Mahaswamigal

== Contributions ==
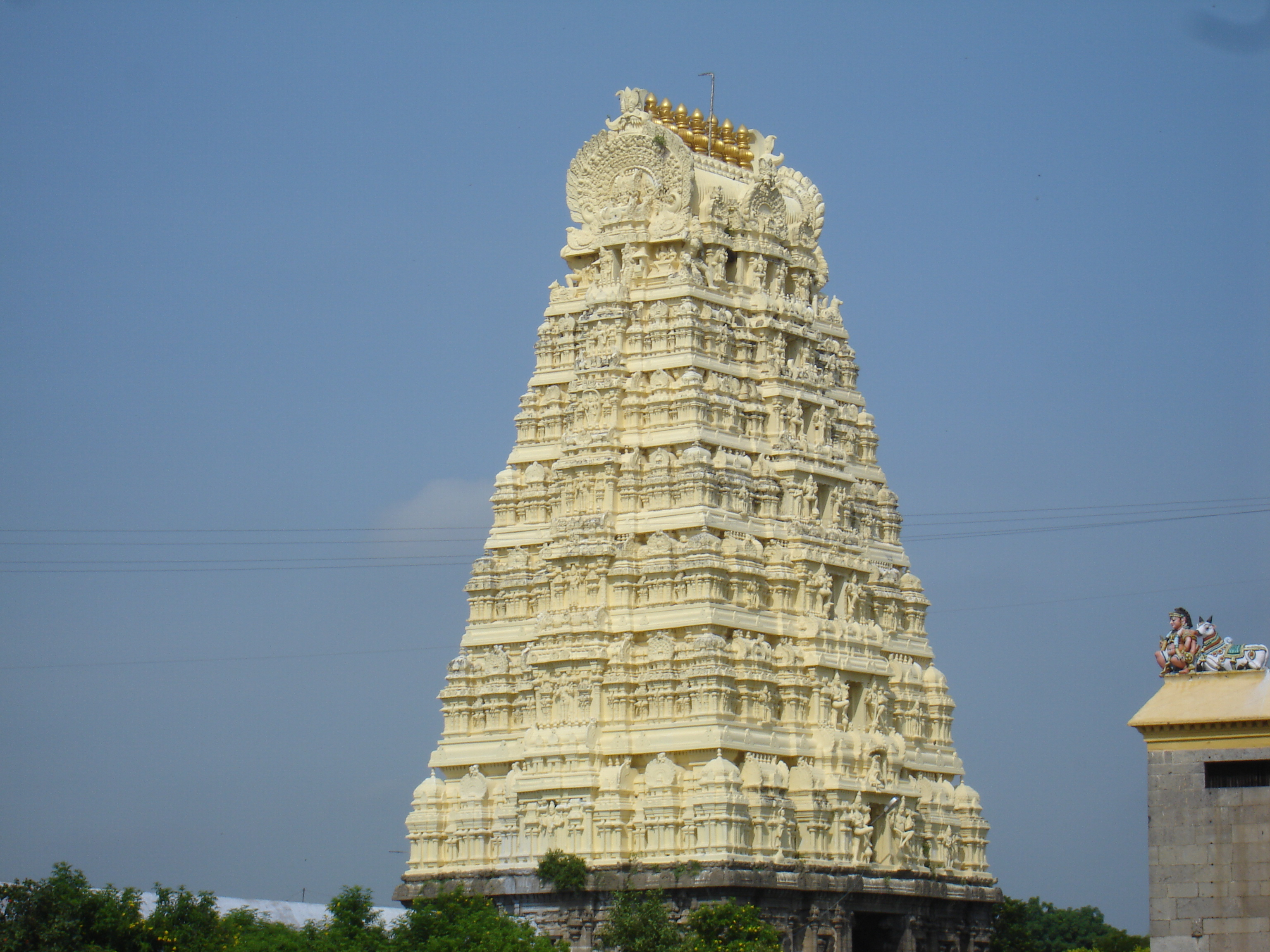
Kamakshi Amman temple

Chandrashekharendra Saraswati started spreading his knowledge in spiritual journeys across the Indian hinterland. These included devotional practices and daily rituals such as performing various Poojas and recitations of the Vedas. Iyengars (who were not part of the mutt), various sub castes and Abrahamic followers became his devotees. He carried the responsibility effortlessly and made simple practices for devotees to increase devotion, like chanting and writing the holy name of Rama. Devotees soon realized he was not a normal person and labelled him a Jagadguru (lit. the guru of the universe) for his help in rectifying their issues. He dedicated his life to the deity Kamakshi in the premises where he was the spiritual guru, Kamakshi Amman temple. The temple is where the goddess herself came personally for devotion to Shiva.

Throughout his life, he practised the Advaita philosophy of his guru, Adi Shankaracharya, the great Hindu philosopher and reformist. He renovated multiple temples across India and increased the recitals of sacred texts like the Vishnu Sahasranāma (which was not allowed for women at the time). He helped Vedic priests in their pronunciation of holy Sanskrit texts and implemented rigorous Agama Sastra teachings describing cosmology, epistemology, philosophical doctrines, precepts on meditation and other topics. He also loved Tamil language and had many discourses with esteemed Tamil scholars. He also bought in the practice of conducting the "Paavai Nonbu Padal Poti"(Margazhi month Thiruppavai and Thiruvempavai singing competition) for young children. He made radical social changes by allowing devotees inside the temple premises. The day India became independent on August 15th 1947, he gave a speech on the significance of the flag and the Ashoka Chakra in it.

He died on 8 January 1994, a few months before his birth centenary . His attainment of Videhamukti invited devotees to go beyond numerology and believe only the name of god in their lifespan. He was also considered an avatar of the Hindu deity Shiva.

=== Discourses ===
As a religious head of the Kanchi Kamakoti Peetham obliged to spiritual duties, Chandrashekharendra Saraswati travelled across the country by foot and started giving discourses. On several occasions he addressed the common masses on diverse aspects of dharma, ancient culture, and a variety of subjects. He delivered the discourses on simple verandahs, river beds and sabhas (smaller halls) unlike in the 21st century. The discourses "Deivathin Kural" (The Voice of God) were compiled by his disciple R. Ganapathi and published in English and Tamil as. It has been also translated to other Indian languages. The discourses were related to various subjects across different topics, which are well researched and well advised. His discourses were important for his devotees and others across India suffering from lack of devotion. He brought back the ancient practice of sanatana dharma, travelling throughout the country offering guidance, founding schools and providing for the people.

=== Influence on Indian Freedom Movement ===
Chandrashekharendra Saraswati reconverted Indian National Congress leader F. G. Natesa Iyer from Christianity to Hinduism. Iyer, as a boy of ten, took shelter with Englishmen who brought him up and converted him to Christianity. Twenty years later, dissatisfied with the ability of the priests to clarify his doubts, he met the Kanchi Sankaracharya and, getting satisfactory answers from him, reconverted to Hinduism.

The Indian National Congress, in the decade of the 1920s, started organising the Non-Cooperation Movement, which involved getting many people to protest on the streets. F.G.Natesa Iyer, the leading Congress activist of Tiruchirappalli then, as also the elected Mayor, took this opportunity to convert the movement to also show support for Chandrashekharendra Saraswati. He described the occasion, thus: "I was nominated by the public as the chairman of the Reception Committee for arranging a reception for the Acharya of Sri Kanchi Kamakoti Peetam. As the municipal chairman, it was my duty to provide a proper welcome and respect to Swamigal who was visiting after a long time. The opportunity to welcome His Holiness in a manner that was exponentially greater than receptions given to kings and viceroys, was accorded to me, along with my supporters: Sri M.Kandaswamy Servai, Sri. R.Srinivasa Iyengar, the lawyer and the larger public. The procession that was seven miles long, was preceded by seven groups of nadaswaram players, three band groups, four elephants, many horses and camels, instrumental players, Bhajan singers, Seva Samitis. I had the blessing to hold the front side of the ivory palanquin where our guru for the whole world, Sri Sankaracharya Swamigal was seated. He gave darshan to numerous people lined on both sides of the roads, all of whom were chanting the words "Jaya Jaya Shankara Hara Hara Shankara", in every floor, irrespective of their religion, caste or creed. There was no count of arathis, Poorna kumbams, garlands, asthika goshams. The procession that started at 6 pm ended at 10 pm in front of the mutt at Thiruvanaikkaval. I was enthralled in my service to Swamigal as service to Lord Shiva himself".

== See also ==
- Kanchi Kamakoti Peetham
- Ramana Maharshi
- Dalai lama
- M. S. Subbulakshmi
- Vinoba Bhave
- Sathya Sai Baba

== Books ==
- Svāmī, Candraśekharendra Sarasvatī (2000). Hindu dharma : the universal way of life (4th ed.). Mumbai: Bharatiya Vidya Bhavan. ISBN 978-8172760557.
- Sri Chandrasekharendra Saraswati (2006). The Vedas (7th ed.). Mumbai: Bharatiya Vidya Bhavan. ISBN 978-81-7276-401-2.
- Candraśekharendra Sarasvatī Svāmī (2008). Voice of the Guru : The Guru tradition (2nd ed.). Mumbai: Bharatiya Vidya Bhavan. ISBN 978-8172764159.
- Svāmī, Pūjyaśrī Candrasekharendra Sarasvatī (2001). Śri Śaṅkara Bhagavatpādācārya's Saundaryalaharī = Saundaryalaharī An exposition (1st ed.). Mumbai: Bharatiya Vidya Bhavan. ISBN 978-8172762124.
- Jagadguru His Holiness Sri Chandrasekharendra Saraswati Swamigal (2008). Fitzgerald, Michael Oren (ed.). Introduction to Hindu dharma : illustrated. Bloomington, Ind.: World Wisdom. ISBN 978-1933316482.
- Candraśekharendra Sarasvatī Svāmī (2008). Voice of God Vol 1 and 2 (2nd ed.). Mumbai: Bharatiya Vidya Bhavan. ISBN 978-81-7276-415-9.
- Chandraśekharendra Sarasvatī Svāmī (1978). Voice of God 7 Volumes in Tamil (தெய்வத்தின் குரல்), a collection of his discourses (26th ed.). Chennai: Vanathi Publishers.

Preceded by Mahadevendra Saraswati V	Kanchi Kāmakoti Pīṭhādhipati; 13 February 1907 – 20 January 1994	Succeeded by Jayendra Saraswati
