= Bodhendra Saraswati II =

Hindu saint

Sri Sri Bodhendra Saraswathi Swamigal
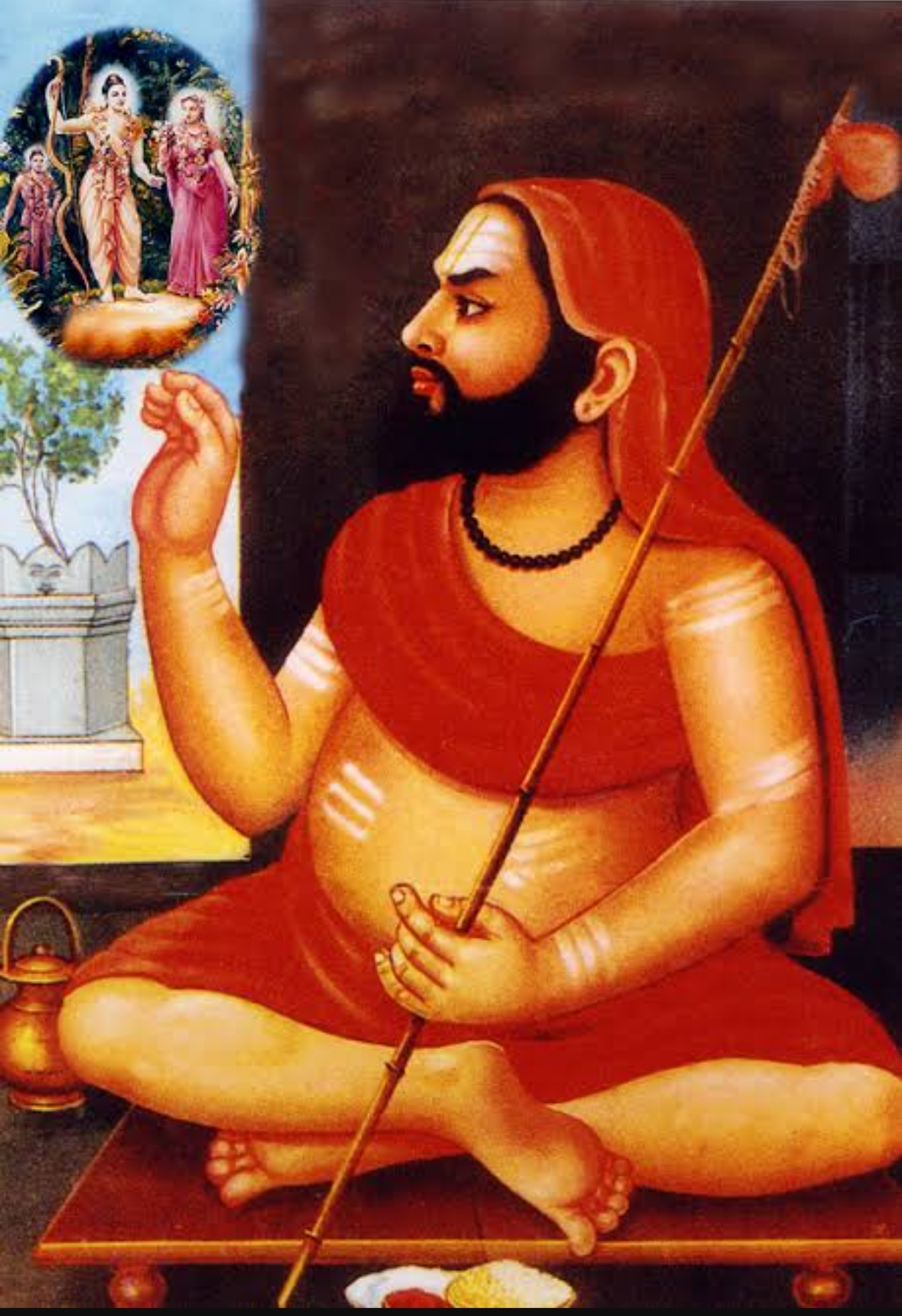

Personal life
- Born: Purushottaman; 1610 Kanchipuram
- Died: 1692 (aged 81–82) Govindapuram, Thanjavur
- Resting place: Samadhi of Bodhendra Saraswathi

Religious life
- Religion: Hindu

Senior posting
- Period in office: 1638–1692
- Predecessor: Viswakendra Saraswati swamigal

Bodhendra Saraswathi was a 17th-century Hindu pontiff and the 59th Jagathguru (head) of the Kanchi matha, Kanchipuram, Tamil Nadu, India. He spent his later life in Govindapuram.

== Early life ==
Bodhendra was born to Kesavapanduranga Yogi and Suguna in the beginning of 17th century (in the year 1610) at Kanchipuram, which was then headquarters of Kanchi matha. The couple did not have children for a long time and believed that they were blessed by the devotion to Viswakendra Saraswati (Athmabodhar), the 58th Jagathguru of the Kanchi Matha. The child was named Purushotaman by Viswakendra Saraswati.

Seeing the qualities and potential of the child, the jagadguru Sri Viswakendra Saraswati requested his parents to hand over the child to the Kanchi Matha with the hope of making the child succeed him. The parents willingly gave the child to this religious center of Vedic learning. The child attained mastery over Sruti and the Smriti. It gradually dawned on him that nama sankeerthanam (chanting of Lord Rama's name) would fetter the cycles of death and birth in Kali Yuga. He chanted Rama nama (the name of Lord Rama) one thousand times every day.

== Initiation of Sainthood ==
Athmabodhar instructed Bodhendra Saraswati to proceed to Kanchipuram after obtaining Lakshmi Sreedhar's Bhagawan Nama Koumundhi from the author himself at Jagannatha Kshetram (Puri), and to compose a lakh of Bhagawan Nama slokas (sacred texts on lord) on the basis of Bhagawan Nama Koumundhi. The above-mentioned mandate of his guru (teacher) gave him a golden opportunity to pour out his devotion to Lord Rama and to vindicate the efficacy of Rama Nama (name of Lord Rama).

At Lakshmi Sreedhar's residence in Jagannath, a young couple were waiting to see Lakshmi Sreedhar. The husband recounted his unfortunate plight: He and his wife had embarked on a pilgrimage to Kasi, when his wife was abducted by a group of Muslims. Heart broken, he had continued to complete his pilgrimage and while returning, was taking bath at a river bank. A little distance away a group of Muslim ladies were bathing, and one of them, on perceiving him, dissociated herself from the group and ran towards him and urged him, "Dear husband let us run away and escape".Both had retired to safety, and come hither to receive instructions as to what to do further, since it was not proper to receive the spouse without undergoing a prayaschiitam (atonement). Lakshmi Sreedhar submitted that chanting Sri Rama Nama would suffice. Bodhendral asked Sreedhar for evidence. Lakshmi Sreedhar pointed out the section from "Bhagwaan Nama Koumudhi". Bodendral decided to prove the veracity of this statement and accompanied the couple to the Pushkarani (Holy water tank). At His instance, the abducted girl dipped into the waters in her muslim garb and surfaced, with Hindu attire and a bindhi on her forehead. This miracle occurred consequent to the divinity inherent in Bodendral. Following this incident at Jagannath, He was named Bhagawan Nama Bodendral.

== Govindapuram ==
Bodhendra Saraswathi, during the course of his wanderings in the Cauvery delta was attracted by the beauty of the place and decided to attain samadhi or salvation at the spot. One morning, in the Purattasi (September–October) month of the year 1692, Bodhendra Saraswathi attained Jeeva Samadhi sitting in a yogic state. He attained Samadhi at Govindapuram on Full Moon day in the month of Proshtapada of the cyclic year Prajotpatti (1692 AD). The Samadhi was not to be found for a couple of years and was later discovered by Sri Venkatarama Swami (Sadguru Swamigal) of Marudanallur. The Adishtanam was built by the then ruling King Saraboji, on request of Sadguru Swamigal.

== Samadhi ==
Samadhi of Bodhendra Saraswathi Swamigal
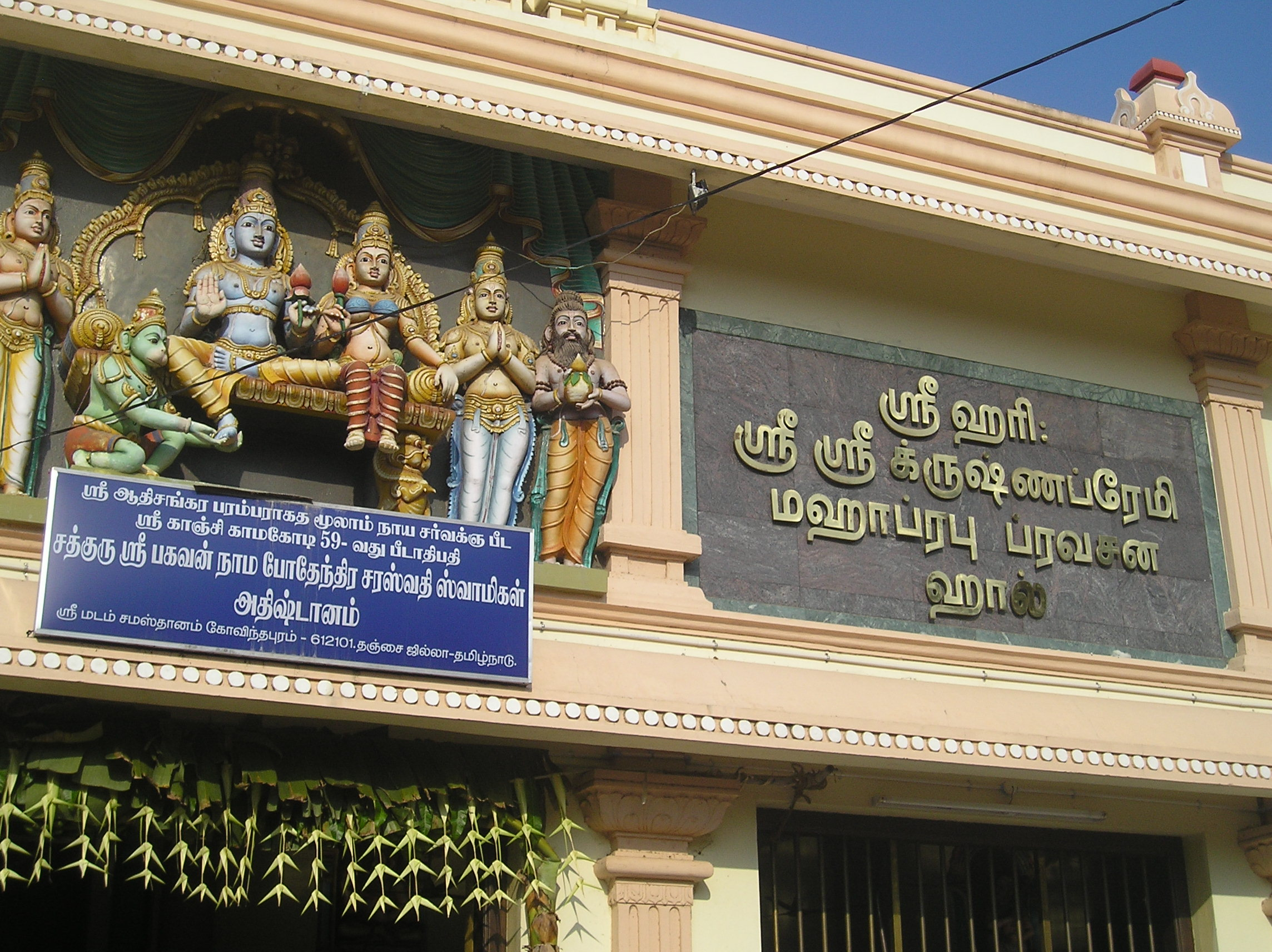
- Jeeva Samadhi of Bodhendra Saraswathi Swamigal

- Location within Tamil Nadu

General information
- Architectural style: Dravidian
- Location: Govindapuram, Kumbakonam, India
- Coordinates: 11.010833°N 79.463889°E

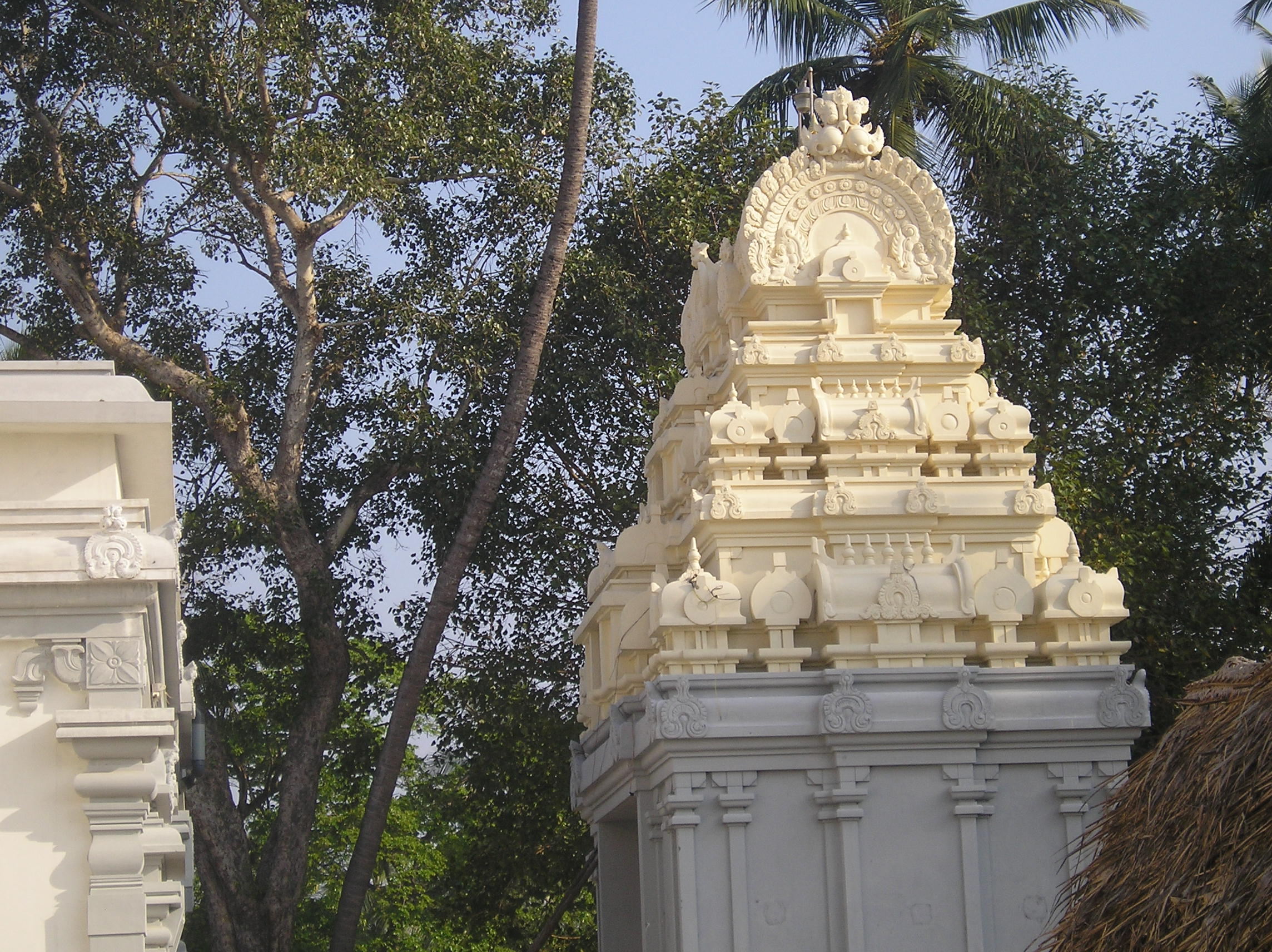
Main entrance Gopuram

The samadhi (shrine) of Sri Bodhendra Saraswathi, the 59th Shankaracharya of Kanchi matha is located in the town of Govindapuram and is an important Hindu pilgrimage destination. The samadhi was constructed by Bodhendra's disciples over the physical space of his internment and yearly aradhanas are conducted at his samadhi. It is maintained by the Kanchi matha.
