= Nilakantha Diksita =

17th-century author and government minister of Madurai

Nilakantha Diksita was a minister in the 17th century court of King Thirumalai Nayak of Madurai. He composed several poems and literary works, including Ananda Sagara Stavam.

== Biography ==
Mahakavi Sri Neelakanta Deekshithar was born near the end of the 16 th century on 23 May 1594, born in the Tamil month of Vaigasi in the Jaya Varusha of Tamil Panchangam. He is of the Bharadwaja Gotra and a Sama Vedi. He was an ardent devotee of Goddess Meenakshi. He was from the lineage of the great advaitic saint Appaya Dikshita.

During his ministerial job in the royal court of Tirumalai Nayaka King of Madurai (current day Tamil Nadu, India) under his supervision the Vasantha Mantapam or now known as Pudu Mandapa, at Madurai Meenakshi Amman Temple was built.He also dug Vandiyur Theppakulam a big Pond. During excavatory work for the Pond a Vinayagar Idol was found and named as Mukkuruni Vinayagar placed now in Madurai Meenakshi Amman Temple. During his old age he settled at Palamadai Village in Tirunelveli District and place further south of Madurai. Palamadai village was actually gifted to him by Thirumalai Nayaka King for this archaeological evidence is in the form of Copper plaques which was used in those periods and it is also published in the Madura Manual by Archives of India. This is also engraved in the entrance wall of mangalankureswarar Sannidhi facing North. The copy of the engravings can be had from the epigraphy section of ASI.

== Writings ==
His works are regularly published by the Mahakavi Neelakanta Deekshithar Trust at Chennai. Besides they are also published in spiritual magazines like Amman Darshanam published from Chennai.

His works in the language are literary classics, viz., gaṅgāvataraṇam, vairāgyaśatakam, naḻacaritram, kaliviḍambanam, ānandasāgarastavaḥ, śāntivilāsaḥ, śivotkarṣamañjarī, mukundavilāsaḥ, raghuvīrastavaḥ, caṇḍīrahasyam, anyāpadeśaśatakam, nīlakaṇṭhavijayacampūḥ, kaiyaṭavyākhyānam, sabhārañjanaśatakam, gururājastavaḥ, śivatattvarahasyam, and śivalīlārṇavaḥ.
