= Jayendra Saraswathi =

Sixty ninth head of the Sri Kanchi Kamakoti Peetam

His Holiness Jagadguru Shankaracharya Sri Jayendra Saraswati Shankaracharya Swamigal
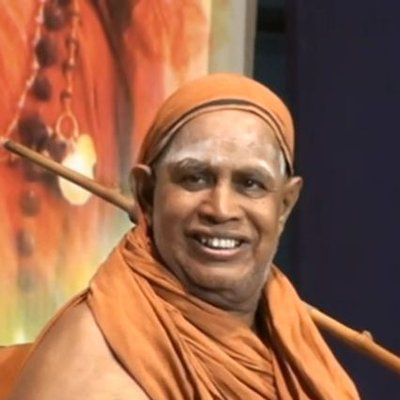
- Acharyal listening to a Devotee speech

Personal life
- Born: Subrahmanyam Iyer; 18 July 1935 Irulneeki, Thiruthuraipoondi, Tamil Nadu
- Died: 28 February 2018 (aged 82) Kanchi Kamakoti Peetham, Kanchipuram, Tamil Nadu
- Honors: Shankaracharya

Religious life
- Religion: Hinduism

Kanchi Kāmakoti Pīṭādipati
- In office 1994 – 28 February 2018
- Preceded by: Chandrashekharendra Saraswati VIII
- Succeeded by: Vijayendra Saraswati

Jagadguru Sri Jayendra Saraswathi Shankaracharya Swamigal (born Subrahmanyam S/O Mahadeva Iyer; 18 July 1935 – 28 February 2018) was the 69th Shankaracharya Guru and head or pithadhipati of the Kanchi Kamakoti Peetham. Subramanyam Iyer was nominated by his predecessor, Chandrashekarendra Saraswati, as his successor and was given the pontifical title Sri Jayendra Saraswathi on 22 March 1954.

Jayendra Saraswati succeeded Chandrashekarendra Saraswati in 1960,. He conducted all the activities of the mutt with the oversight of his Guru out of reverence. His successor Sri Vijayendra Saraswati was anointed by the then Senior Pontiff Mahaperiyava during his lifetime in the early 1980s.

== Early life ==
Jayendra Saraswathi was born as Subrahmanyam to Mahadeva Iyer and Saraswathi Ammal on 18 July 1935. He completed schooling at Irulneeki primary school and at a middle school at nearby Adichapuram village. Then he shifted to a veda pathasala at Thiruvanaikoil in Trichy. He visited the village on holidays and used to play normal games such as marbles and 'killi-thandu' like other children of his age. Chandrashekarendra Saraswathi selected him as his successor, when he was only 19 years old.

== Contributions ==
Jayendra Saraswathi was head of the mutt established by Adi Shankaracharya in 482 BCE . He received his spiritual tutelage from 'Maha Periyava' and travelled the length and breadth of the country with his guru. He delivered religious discourse besides involving himself in various spiritual and social activities as well. Under his guidance, the mutt started several schools and hospitals. The mutt runs several schools, eye clinics and hospitals.

He renounced the world including his parents at the age of 19 to become spiritual guru. He travelled with his senior initially and then, lead many more yatras across India barefoot to spread awareness on Sanatana Dharma.

Chandrashekarendra Saraswathi had observed three unique qualities in his shishya (student) Jayendra Saraswathi: Jan Akarshanam, Dhan Akarshanam and Jal Akarshanam and hence chose him as his successor. Jayendra Saraswathi reportedly had the ability to attract rain anywhere such that people used to call him to places where there was drought.

Jayendra Saraswathi visited Manasarovar and Kailash in 1998 and became the only Shankaracharya to do so after the Adi Shankara. There he installed the idol of Adi Shankara. One of his important contributions is founding of the Sri Chandrasekharendra Saraswathi Viswa Mahavidyalaya, a deemed university in the name of his guru. Under his tenure, Kanchi Math ran the deemed university and dozens of schools and hospitals — territories previously not in the reach of Mutt — besides over 50 traditional Vedic schools and temples. He broke the restraining rules of the Math and reached out to the downtrodden. He went to Harijan bastis and attracted thousands of new followers and devotees. He transformed a spiritual and ritualistic Math into a socially vibrant one. This brought him high popularity and also into interaction with a multitude of social and political leaders in the country.

The followers of the mutt call Jayendra Saraswathi a reformist saint and credit him with ensuring that the preachings of Adi Sankara were spread among people beyond the Brahmin community. This he did by encouraging the spiritual mutt to become more of a social service-oriented one and making it all-inclusive. He played a part in trying to resolve the Ram Janmabhoomi-Babri Masjid dispute during the NDA rule, by engaging with stakeholders from both communities and the government.

During his time as the head seer, he launched several charity initiatives such as the ‘Jana Kalyan, Jana Jagaran,’ a movement to "serve the people and awaken the masses". The charity programme aimed to establish temples in Dalit colonies and engage Dalits in temple rituals to expand the Hindu collective beyond the Dravidian polity's anti-brahmin stance. He also appointed Dalit trustees in temples such as Mylapore Kapaleeshwarar.

According to people who had been close to him during this period, Jayendra Saraswathi recognised the faultline in Hinduism that had triggered the conversions and embarked on an attempt to bring in Dalits and other socially oppressed classes into the mainstream Hindu fold. For months, he toured the state extensively, visiting villages, talking to Dalits and other communities. Departing from the usual convention of the mutt, which insisted that the pontiffs travel only by foot, he had got some of his devotees to donate a customised van that he used for his travel to these villages.

Under his tenure, The Kanchi Mutt started many schools, eye clinics and hospitals. Child Trust Hospital, Hindu Mission Hospital, Tamil Nadu Hospital and other public welfare institutions which are religious focused were developed by him.

He promulgated concept of Santana Dharma.

He also conducted ‘Viswaroopa Yatra’ and ‘Sandarsanam’ at the Poranki Veda Pathasala. He played an important role in the establishment of the eye hospital – Sankara Nethrayala – between Vijayawada and Guntur in 2004. Jayendra Saraswathi's primary motto was to promote spirituality among people and also spread the bhakti cult. He renovated or participated in ‘kumbhabhishekam’ of more than 100 temples in the State. The seer took part in the ‘kumbhabhishekam’ at the Kanaka Durga Temple in Vijayawada in the 90s. He also installed Lord Krishna's idol at the Labbipet Venkateswara Swamy temple in 2015. The Kanchi Kamakoti Charitable Trust in Tenali is among the several institutions set up by him.

== Arrest and acquittal ==
In 2004, Jayendra Saraswathi was arrested in connection with the Sankararaman murder case on Diwali day by Jayalalithaa government. The court said that the complainant failed to support the prosecution and he was given bail. The trial went on till 2013 when he was acquitted by the court.

== Sexual harassment allegations ==
Tamil writer Anuradha Ramanan said she was subjected to sexual harassment by Jayendra Saraswathi when she met him back in 1992, when she was taken to negotiate the release of the spiritual magazine "Amma" by the monastery. Anuradha Ramanan accused Saraswathi of making sexual advances. She said that during their first meeting, he spoke about the proposed journal and offered to make her its editor, Ramanan agreed to the offer. During their final meeting, she said, he began using indecent language, and when she looked up from the notebook, the woman who took her to him was in a sexually intimate position with him. She said that Saraswathi "approached" her, and when she objected, the other woman tried to persuade her of her "good fortune". When she left the place, the Shankaracharya allegedly asserted that she keep her mouth shut.

Ramanan said that she went to a woman police officer close to her to lodge a complaint, but did not do so because she feared for the future of her daughters. She reported that she was subjected to attempted murder when a truck hit her car in which she was traveling and another murder attempt was made on her life when she was admitted to the hospital. In December 2004, she said she would have met with the same fate as that of Sankararaman if she had made the disclosure 12 years ago when the alleged incident took place.

== Death and Samadhi ==
On 27 February 2018, for doing the daily routine Pooja, Jayendra Saraswathi asked Vijayendra Saraswathi to perform the routine poojas, which acted as a premonition that he wanted to hand over the reins to his successor. He even performed Sandhyavandhanam that same day. The 82-year old seer was admitted to a hospital near Kamakshi Amman Temple in Kanchipuram the following morning due to breathing problems. However, he was reported to be in good health and even walked whilst being inside the hospital. A few hours later, hospital and mutt sources announced that he had died and issued statement "The 69th Acharya of Sri Kanchi Kamakoti Peetam Jagadguru Pujyashri Jayendra Saraswathi Shankaracharya Swamigal attained Siddhi at 9.00 am today - Shukla Trayodashi - 28 Feb. 2018 at Sri Kanchi Kamakotii Peetam Sankara Matam, Kanchipuram."

As a sanyasi, Jayendra Saraswati was not cremated. He was instead interred in a tomb called a Samadhi, that is referred to as a 'Brindavanam' or 'adhishthanam'. A Tulasi tree was planted and a Shiva lingam was consecrated on top so that it will become a permanent shrine. The process of interment is called 'Brindavana Pravesha Karyakramam', which began on 1 March 2018 at 8am.

The priests started performing chanting of mantras and his body was kept for devotees to pay respects from 10 am of 28 February 2018 to 8am of 1 March 2018. Jayendra Saraswati's body was placed in the hall of the Kanchi math in a seated position, for devotees to catch a final glimpse. Devotees from various places visited the mutt from the morning of 28 February and throughout the night and paid homage to the late Acharya till 8am of 1 March 2018. Abhishekam of Shiva linga, a ritual was performed with chanting of Rudram and Chamakam on 1 March from 8am. Kanchi Mutt manager said over 5 lakh people came to the shrine to pay respects. It was decided that Jayendra Sarawasthi would be laid to rest beside his guru, Sri Chandrasekharendra Saraswathi and hence the seer's ‘brindavanam’, or final resting place, was constructed right next to the one that serves as the brindavanam for the 68th pontiff Sri Maha Periyava.

Mutt officials stopped the public darshan by 8am on 1 March 2018 and initiated the installation of the brindavanam by reciting slokas. The final rites of Saraswathi began with an 'abhishekam' ( bath) with milk and honey at 10am. A huge crowd had assembled in the small auditorium to watch the proceedings of the installation of the Brindavanam. The body of Jayendra Saraswathi was later carried to the adjacent ‘Brindavan Annexe,’ for his Samadhi, where the mortal remains of his predecessor Sri Chandrasekerendra Saraswathi were interred in 1994. The rituals for lowering Jayendra Saraswathi's body in the 7 x 7 ft burial pit in the Brindhavanam Annexe started after 11 am on 1 March 2018. The Mutt's Pontiff Sri Shankara Vijayendra Saraswathi performed the poojas for his guru and predecessor. The 69th pontiff of the Kanchi Sankara Mutt Sri Jayendra Saraswathi was placed in the ‘samadhi’ within the Mutt premises in Kanchipuram.

=== Reactions, tributes and legacy ===
The Prime Minister Narendra Modi and Vice President Muppavarapu Venkaiah Naidu mourned the death of Saraswathi.

Notable dignitaries who offered condolences and paid homage following his demise include former Deputy Prime Minister of India LK Advani, former Union Minister and Pattali Makkal Katchi leader Anbumani Ramadoss, Dravida Munnetra Kazhagam leader MK Stalin, Indian President Ram Nath Kovind, Tamil Nadu Governor Banwarilal Purohit, Union ministers D. V. Sadananda Gowda and Pon Radhakrishnan, Banwarilal Purohit, O. Panneerselvam, Sengottaiyan, and Ilayaraja.

Muslims from Kanchipuram and nearby places also visited the Kanchi Mutt after his death, to pay their respects to him. They offered prayers (Namaz) as a token of respect for the Swami. The Nawab of Arcot is also known to be very close to the Mutt and its Acharyas.

Religious titles
Preceded by Chandrashekharendra Saraswati VIII	Kanchi Kāmakoti Pīṭhādhipati; Elected on: 22 March 1954; Succeeded on: 9 January 1995	Succeeded by Vijayendra Saraswati
