= Kanchi Kamakoti Peetham =

Hindu monastery in Tamil Nadu, India

Coordinates: 12.843214°N 79.700834°E

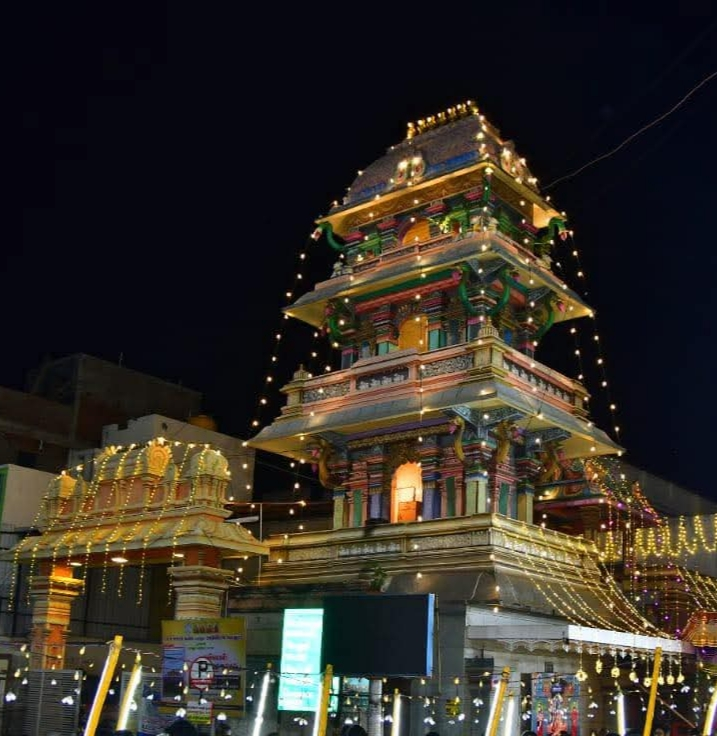
- Moolamnaya Sarvajna Sri Kanchi Kamakoti Peetam
- Type: Religious
- Location: Kanchipuram, Tamil Nadu, India
- First Jagadguru: Adi Shankara (disputed)
- Present Jagadguru: Vijayendra Saraswati
- Successor: Satya Chandrashekharendra Saraswati
- Affiliations: Hinduism
- Website: www.kamakoti.org

Sri Kanchi Kamakoti Peetham, also called the Sri Kanchi Matham or the Moolamnaya Sarvagnya Peetham, is a Hindu religious center of Vedic learning, located in Kanchipuram, Tamil Nadu. It is located near the Kamakshi Amman Temple of the Shaktism tradition, which also contains a shrine dedicated to the alleged final resting place (disputed) of the Advaita Vedanta teacher Adi Shankara.

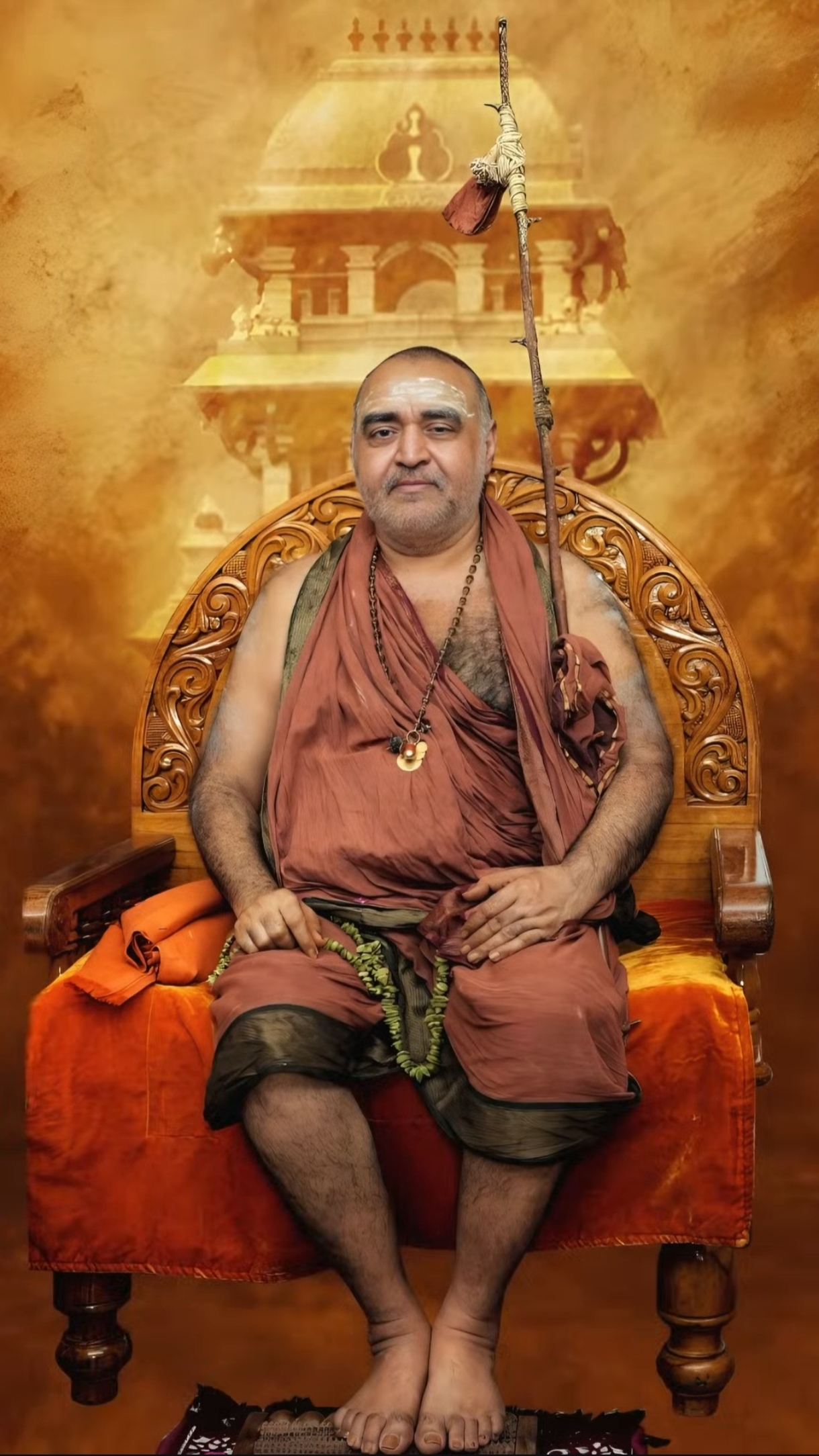
Jagadguru Vijayendra Saraswathi Swamigal, the 70th and Current Peetadhipathi of Kanchi Kamakoti Peetam

The matha-tradition attributes its founding to Adi Shankara, but this and the reliability of the matha's succession list has been questioned. According to the Sri Kanchi math tradition, the matha was founded at Kanchipuram, and shifted south to the temple city of Kumbakonam in the mid-18th century due to the on-going wars, when there was warfare in the region, and returned to Kanchipuram in the 19th century.

Historically, the Kanchi Math was established as the Kumbakonam Mutt in 1821 as a branch of the Sringeri Mutt, and became involved with the Kamakshi temple in Kanchipuram in 1839, "set[ing] up shop in Kanchipuram at the turn of the last [19th] century."

The peetham gained a good reputation under the leadership of Sri Chandrashekharendra Saraswati VIII (born 20 May 1894; 68th Shankaracharya 1907 – 8 January 1994), who was regarded as an avatara purusha, a realised seer. (Note: T.M. Krishna (Mar 04, 2018), Jayendra Saraswathi redefined Kanchi Mutt's role – but did not earn the stature of his predecessor, scroll.in) The peetham lost authority and standing under the leadership of Sri Jayendra Saraswati (born 1935; appointed successor 1954; 69th Shankaracharya 3 January 1994 - 28 February 2018), who favoured an outreach to a broader audience beyond the Brahmins, but was implicated and later given a clean chit by the courts in a murder-trial. He was succeeded in February 2018 by Vijayendra Saraswathi Shankaracharya Swamigal.

== Establishment ==
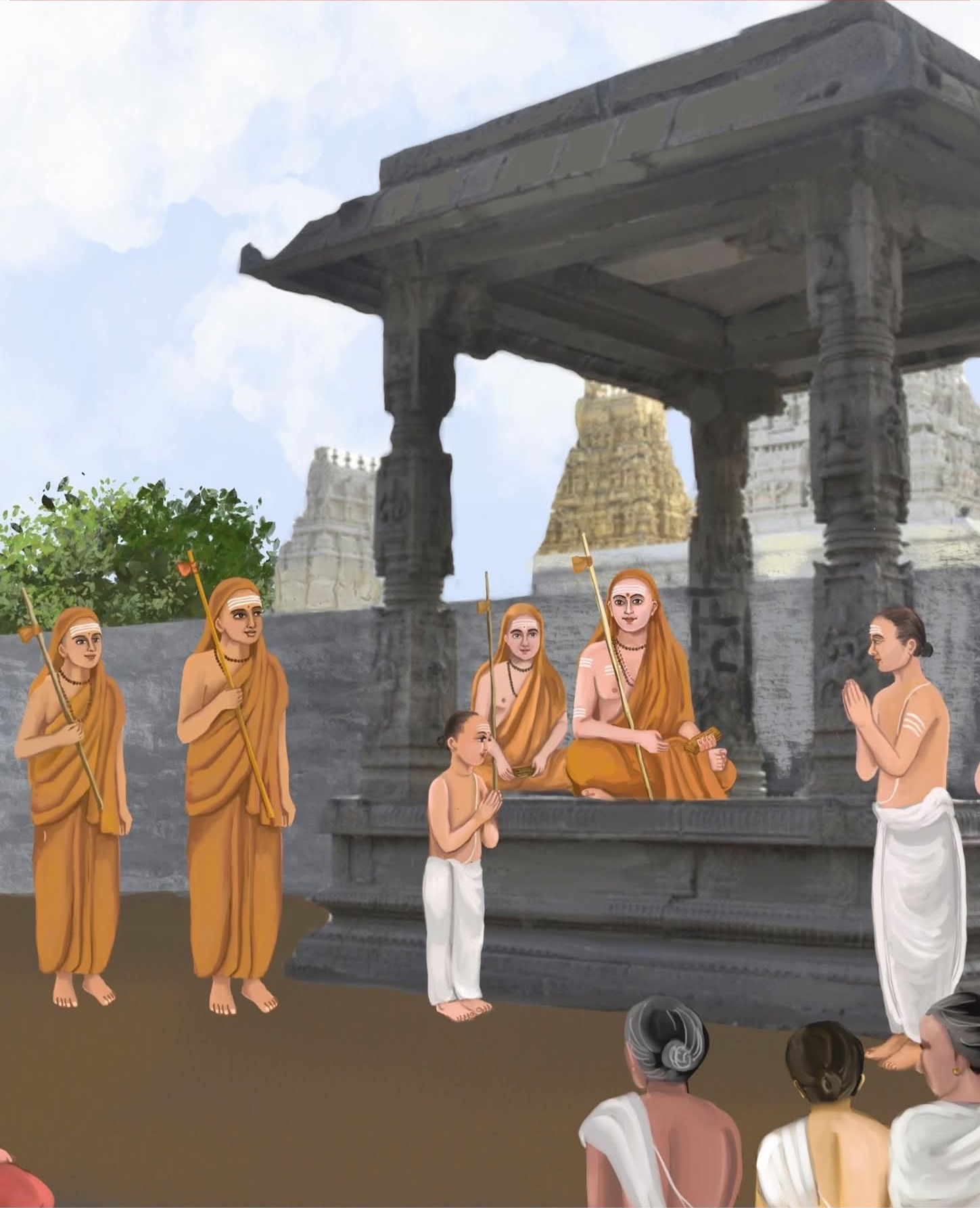
Digital art of Adi Shankara offering discourses at the Kamakshi Amman Temple in Kanchipuram.

=== Traditional accounts ===
The founding of Kanchi Kamakoti Peetam is traditionally attributed by its adherents to Adi Shankara. (Note: See also "Sri Shankaracharya and his connection with Kanchipuram" (PDF).) According to the Kanchi matha's tradition, Adi Shankara was born in 509 BCE and died in 477 BCE, and founded Kanchi Kamakoti Peetham in 482 BCE. The chronology stated in Kanchi matha texts recognizes five major Shankaras: Adi, Kripa, Ujjvala, Muka and Abhinava. According to the Kanchi matha tradition, it is "Abhinava Shankara" that western scholarship recognizes as the Advaita scholar Adi Shankara.

According to the Sri Kanchi matha documents, the matha relocated completely to Kumbakonam in the mid-18th century to escape wars and persecution, returning to Kanchi in the 19th century. According to Jonathan Bader and other scholars, the monastic tradition gives "fear of Muslim atrocities" from Nawab of Arcot, Mysore's Hyder Ali and Tipu Sultan as the reason, but the details remain unclear.

According to T. A. Gopinatha Rao, copperplate inscriptions show that the matha was located at Kanchipuram until 1686 CE, and relocated to Kumbakonam, Tanjore, in the 18th century. Sharma disputes Rao's interpretations of the copper plates, arguing that the dating is dubious, and that most plates do not refer to Kanchi Kamakoti Peetham at all. According to Rao, based on the oldest record found in the respective mathas (1291 and 1346 respectively), Kanchipuram matha may be older than Sringeri Pitham.

=== Disputed chronology ===
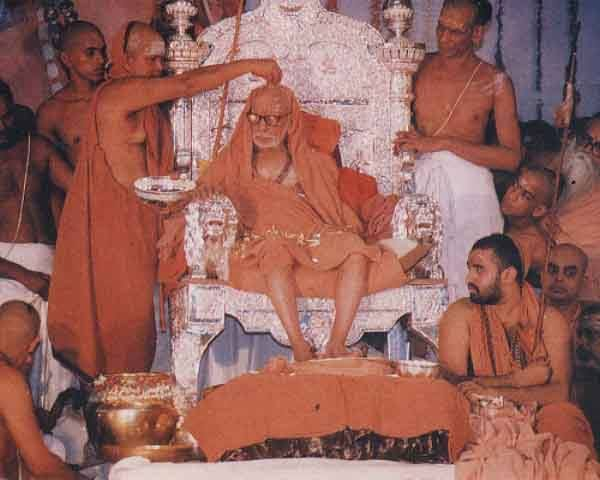
Kanakabhishekam (ceremonial shower of gold coins donated by devotees) of the 68th Jagadguru Chandrashekharendra Saraswati VIII, also known as Mahaperiyava being performed by his successor, the 69th Jagadguru Jayendra Saraswathi Swamigal. At his feet is the 70th Jagadguru Vijayendra Saraswati Swamigal. Together, all three were considered the trinity of the Kanchi Kamakoti Peetham.

The foundation-story of Kanchi Kamakoti Peetham, and it's chronology of Shankaracharyas, is widely disputed. Sringeri matha rejects the claims of Kanchi Kamakoti Peetam, and does not count it among the mathas established by Shankara.

Modern scholarship places Shankara in the 8th century CE, and the story of the four cardinal mathas founded by Shankara dates from the 16th century, putting in question the founding stories of all those mathas, though Christopher Fuller and David Smith regard the Kanchi Shankaracharyas as his "spiritual descendants." According to Sunil, the history of Kanchi Kamakoti Peetham has been rewritten in the 20th century, when Chandrashekharendra Saraswati was the Paramacharya.

=== Historical account ===
Historically, the Kanchi Math was established as the Kumbakonam Mutt in 1821 by the Maratha king of Tanjore, Serfoji II Bhonsle, (Note: See also: * Vidyasankar Sundaresan (3 August 1994), Real history of the Kanchi math * Vidyasankar Sundaresan (sept 6, 2000), kanchi Shankara Mutt) as a branch of the Sringeri Mutt. It became an apostate schismatic institution in 1839 when the Kumbakonam Mutt applied for permission to the English Collector of Arcot to perform the "kumbhabhishekham" of the Kamakshi temple in Kanchipuram. In 1842, the East India Company headquartered at Fort William, Calcutta appointed the head of the mutt as the sole trustee of the Kamakshi temple, despite the protests of the traditional priests of the Kamakshi temple, which are well documented and preserved. Mohan Guruswamy recalls,

My own ancestral village, Nagavedu, is a few miles from Kanchipuram. I remember my father telling me that his father was a young man when the Kanchi Shankaracharya set up shop in Kanchipuram at the turn of the last century. He also said that his father always referred, and as did others in the area, to this new Shankaracharya as the Kumbakonam Shankaracharya. This is a nice play on the word Kumbakonam for in colloquial Tamil it is also used to refer to a shady deal.

== 20th-21st century ==
=== Tensions in the temple leadership ===
Under the leadership of Sri Chandrashekharendra Saraswati VIII (born 20 May 1894; 68th pontiff 1907 – 8 January 1994), who was regarded as an avatara purusha, a realised seer, the peetham gained a significant role as a traditional center of religious studies, focusing on male Brahmin students.

His successor Sri Jayendra Saraswati was appointed as successor in 1954, (Note: Who was Sri Jayendra Saraswathi?, The Indian Express, February 28, 2018) and succeeded him at 3 January 1994, staying in office until his death at 28 February 2018. Jayendra favoured an outreach to a broader audience beyond the Brahmins, propagating Hindu-values and lifestyle in general, leading to tensions between Chandrashekharendra and Jayendra. Due to these tensions, in August 1987 Jayendra disappeared for a couple of days, apparently withdrawing from the temple leadership, but returning just a couple of days later and eventually succeeding Chandrashekharendra Saraswati. Jayendra broadened the scope of the peetham, supporting "schools, colleges, hospitals, and rural programmes." He opposed Christian conversion efforts by active oureach toward the poor and down-throdden, visiting slums and poor neighborhoods. Jayendra was also politically involved, maintaining contacts with the Rashtriya Swayamsevak Sangh, Vishwa Hindu Parishad, Bharatiya Janata Party and the All India Anna Dravida Munnetra Kazhagam.

=== Sankararaman murder case (2004) ===
In 2004, Jayendra Saraswathi and his junior Vijayendra Saraswati were arrested in connection with the Sankararaman murder case on Diwali day. The court said that the complainant failed to support the prosecution and he was given bail. The trial went on till 2013 when he was acquitted by the court, but the murder trial negatively impacted both his standing and his role in society, and the image and influence the Kanchi Mutt.

== Religious center ==
=== Vedic studies ===
The matha offers Vedic studies to male Brahmin students in a number of pathasalas. Under the leadership of Jayendra Saraswati, the peetham took a more liberal stance, also reaching out to a non-Brahmin audience.

=== Cultural preservation ===
The Kanchi monastery, along with other monasteries across India, has been an important preserver and source of historic palm leaf manuscripts.

== Chronological list of Shankaracharyas ==
According to the Peetham, the chronological list of Guru Paramapara of the matham is follows:

1. Sri Adi Shankaracharya (482 BCE–477 BCE)
2. Sri Sureshwaracharya (477 BCE–407 BCE)
3. Sri Sarvajnatmanendra Saraswati (407 BCE–367 BCE)
4. Sri Satyabodhendra Saraswati (367 BCE–268 BCE)
5. Sri Jnanandendra Saraswati (268 BCE–205 BCE)
6. Sri Shuddhanandendra Saraswati (205 BCE–124 BCE)
7. Sri Anandaghanendra Saraswati (124 BCE–55 BCE)
8. Sri Kaivalyananda Yogendra Saraswati (55 BCE–28 CE)
9. Sri Kripashankarendra Saraswati (28 CE–69 CE)
10. Sri Sureshwara Saraswati (69 CE–127 CE)
11. Sri Shivananda Chidghanendra Saraswati (127 CE–172 CE)
12. Sri Chandrashekharendra Saraswati I (172–235)
13. Sri Satchidghanendra Saraswati (235–272)
14. Sri Vidyaghanendra Saraswati (272–317)
15. Sri Gangadharendra Saraswati (317–329)
16. Sri Ujjwala Shankarendra Saraswati (329–367)
17. Sri Sadashivendra Saraswati (367–375)
18. Sri Shankarananda Saraswati (375–385)
19. Sri Martanda Vidyaghanendra Saraswati (385–398)
20. Sri Mukhashankarendra Saraswati (398–437)
21. Sri Chandrashekharendra Saraswati II (437–447)
22. Sri Bodhendra Saraswati I (447–481)
23. Sri Satchisukhendra Saraswati (481–512)
24. Sri Chitsukhendra Saraswati (512–527)
25. Sri Satchidanandaghanendra Saraswati (527–548)
26. Sri Prajnaghanendra Saraswati (548–565)
27. Sri Chidvilasendra Saraswati (565–577)
28. Sri Mahadevendra Saraswati I (577–601)
29. Sri Purnabhodhendra Saraswati (601–618)
30. Sri Bhodhendra Saraswati II (618–655)
31. Sri Brahmanandaghanendra Saraswati (655–668)
32. Sri Chidanandaghanendra Saraswati (668–672)
33. Sri Satchidananda Saraswati (672–692)
34. Sri Chandrashekharendra Saraswati III (692–710)
35. Sri Chitsukhendra Saraswati (710–737)
36. Sri Chitsukhanandendra Saraswati (737–758)
37. Sri Vidyaghanendra Saraswati III (758–788)
38. Sri Abhinava Shankarendra Saraswati (788–840)
39. Sri Satchidvilasendra Saraswati (840–873)
40. Sri Mahadevendra Saraswati II (873–915)
41. Sri Gangadharendra Saraswati II (915–950)
42. Sri Brahmanandaghanendra Saraswati (950–978)
43. Sri Anandaghanendra Saraswati (978–1014)
44. Sri Purnabhodhendra Saraswati II (1014–1040)
45. Sri Paramashivendra Saraswati I (1040–1061)
46. Sri Chandranandabhodhendra Saraswati (1061–1098)
47. Sri Chandrashekharendra Saraswati IV (1098–1166)
48. Sri Advaitanandabodhendra Saraswati (1166–1200)
49. Sri Mahadevendra Saraswati III (1200–1247)
50. Sri Chandrachudendra Saraswati I (1247–1297)
51. Sri Vidyatirthendra Saraswati (1297–1385)
52. Sri Shankaranandendra Saraswati (1385–1417)
53. Purnananda Sadashivendra Saraswati (1417–1498)
54. Vyasachala Mahadevendra Saraswati (1498–1507)
55. Chandrachudendra Saraswati II (1507–1524)
56. Sri Sarvajna Sadashivabodhendra Saraswati (1524–1539)
57. Sri Paramashivendra Saraswati II (1539–1586)
58. Atmabodhendra Saraswati (1586–1638)
59. Bodhendra Saraswati II (1638–1692)
60. Sri Advaitatma Prakashendra Saraswati (1692–1704)
61. Sri Mahadevendra Saraswati IV (1704–1746)
62. Sri Chandrashekharendra Saraswati V (1746–1783)
63. Sri Mahadevendra Saraswati V (1783–1813)
64. Sri Chandrasekharendra Saraswati VI (1813–1851)
65. Sudarshana Mahadevendra Saraswati (1851–1891)
66. Sri Chandrasekharendra Saraswati VII (1891 – 7 February 1907)
67. Sri Mahadevendra Saraswati V (7 February 1907 – 13 February 1907)
68. Sri Chandrashekharendra Saraswati VIII (born 20 May 1894; pontiff 1907 – 8 January 1994)
69. Sri Jayendra Saraswati (born 18 July 1935; appointed as successor 1954; pontif 3 January 1994 – 28 February 2018)
70. Sri Vijayendra Saraswati (28 February 2018 – Present)
71. Sri Satya Chandrashekharendra Saraswati (born 1999; anointed as successor 2025)
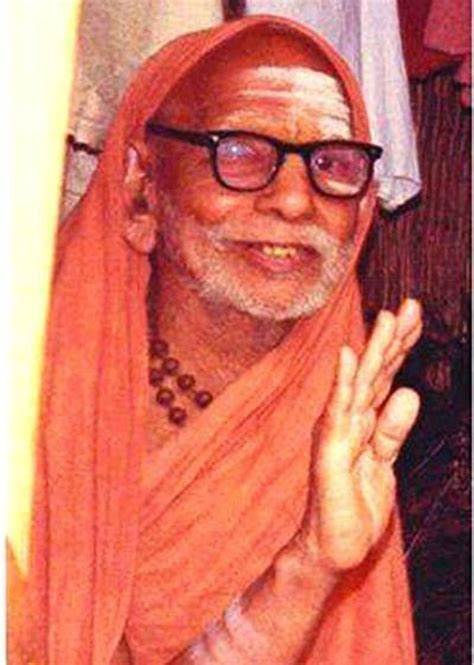
68th Shankaracharya Sri Chandrashekharendra Saraswati Mahaswamigal

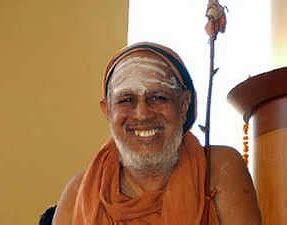
69th Shankaracharya Sri Jayendra Saraswathi Mahaswamigal

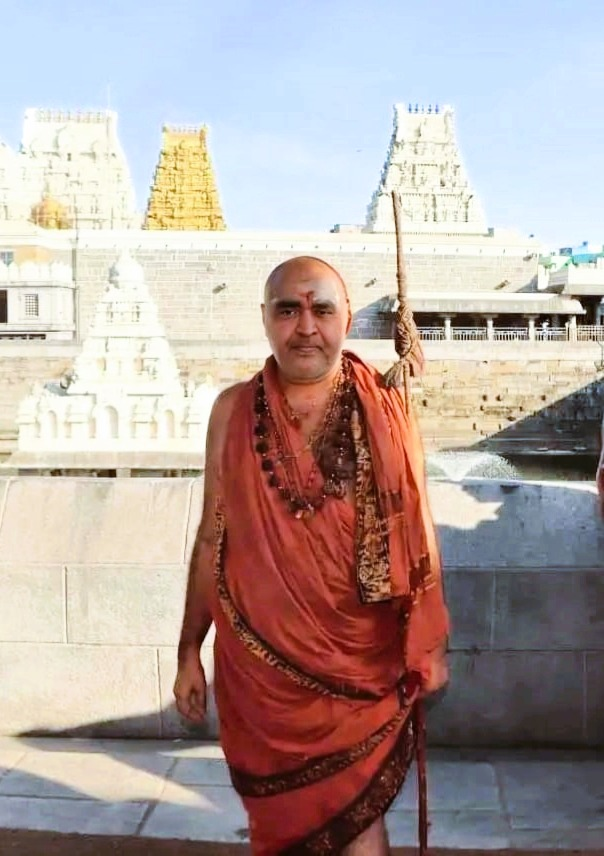
70th Shankaracharya Sri Vijayendra Saraswathi Mahaswamigal

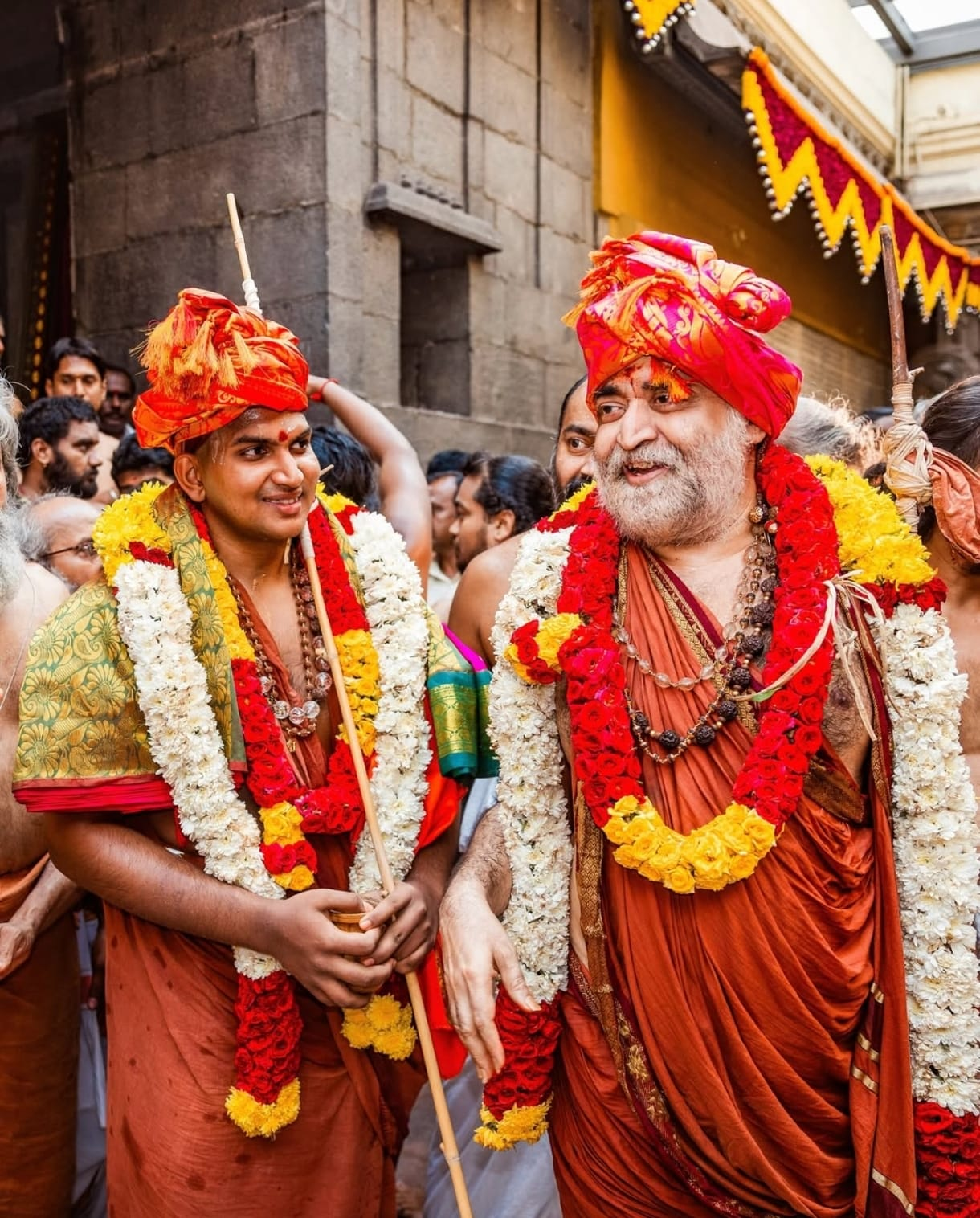
71st Shankaracharya Sri Satya Chandrashekharendra Saraswati Mahaswamigal

== Sankararaman murder case ==
In 2004, Jagadguru Sri Jayendra Saraswathi Mahaswamigal and his junior Jagadguru Sri Vijayendra Saraswati Mahaswamigal were arrested in connection with the Sankararaman murder case on Diwali day. The court said that the complainant failed to support the prosecution and he was given bail. The trial went on till 2013 when he was acquitted by the court.

== Sources ==
Printed sources

- Bader, Jonathan Bader (2000). Conquest of the Four Quarters: Traditional Accounts of the Life of Śaṅkara. Aditya Prakashan. ISBN 978-81-7742-002-9.
- Cenkner, William (1995). A Tradition of Teachers: Śaṅkara and the Jagadgurus Today. Motilal Banarsidass. ISBN 978-81-208-0932-1.
- Clark, Matthew (2006), The Daśanāmī-saṃnyāsīs. The Integration Of Ascetic Lineages Into An Order, BRILL
- Dalal, Roshen (2010), Hinduism: An Alphabetical Guide, Penguin, ISBN 978-0-14-341421-6
- Dalal, Roshen (2014), Hinduism: An Alphabetical Guide, Penguin UK
- Kasturi, Prema; Madhavan, Chithra (2007). South India heritage: an introduction. East West. pp. 173–174. ISBN 978-81-88661-64-0.
- Krishna, Nanditha (2006). Kanchipuram: a heritage of art and religion. Aiyar Foundation. ISBN 978-81-901484-1-2.
- Meena, V. (1974). Temples in South India (1st ed.). Kanniyakumari: Harikumar Arts.
- Rao, T. A. Gopinatha (1916), Copperplate Inscriptions of the Kamakothi Pita, The Law Printing House
- Sarasvati, Jayēdra; Mahadevan, T. M. P. (2003). Preceptors of Advaita. Samata Books. ISBN 9788185208510.
- Scheifinger, Heinz (23 May 2016). "Online Connections, Online Yatras". In Ajaya Kumar Sahoo; Johannes G. de Kruijf (eds.). Indian Transnationalism Online: New Perspectives on Diaspora. Routledge. ISBN 978-1-317-11740-7.
- Sharma, Varanasi Rajgopal (1987), Kanchi Kamakoti Math - A Myth, Ganga-Tunga Prakashan
- Sunil, K. P. (13 September 1987). "The Curious Case of the Missing Monk". The Illustrated Weekly of India. 108 (26–49).
- Suthren Hirst, Jacqueline G. (2005). Samkara's Advaita Vedanta: A Way of Teaching. Routledge. ISBN 978-1-134-25441-5.
- Veeramani, K. (1988), Kanchi Sankarachariar, Saint Or Sectarian?, Dravidar Kazhagam

Web-sources
