= List of modern yoga gurus =

Modern yoga gurus are people widely acknowledged to be gurus of modern yoga in any of its forms, whether religious or not. The role implies being well-known and having a large following; in contrast to the old guru-shishya tradition, the modern guru-follower relationship is not secretive, not exclusive, and does not necessarily involve a tradition. Many such gurus, but not all, teach a form of yoga as exercise; others teach forms which are more devotional or meditational; many teach a combination. Several have been affected by scandals of various kinds.

== Gurus ==
Well-known gurus of modern yoga
Guru	Dates	Gender	Country	Lineage (guru)	School or order	Postures (Asana)	Meditation (Dhyana)	Devotion (Bhakti)	Other practices	Scandal (alleged abuses)
Anandamayi Ma	1896–1982	Female	India		Self-realization	No	Yes			
Sri Aurobindo	1872–1950	Male	India		Sri Aurobindo Ashram	No	Yes			
Beryl Bender Birch	1942–	Female	US	K. Pattabhi Jois	Power Yoga	Yes	No	No		
Yogi Bhajan	1929–2004	Male	India		Kundalini Yoga	Yes	Yes	Guru Nanak		Sexual
Gregorian Bivolaru	1952–	Male	Romania		Movement for Spiritual Integration into the Absolute	Yes	Yes	No	Tantra	Sex with minors, human trafficking, financial
Bikram Choudhury	1944–	Male	India		Bikram Yoga	Yes	No	No	Fixed sequence of postures, in heated room	Sexual, assault, racism, homophobia
Amrit Desai	1932–	Male	India	Kripalvananda	Kripalu Yoga	Yes			Kundalini yoga, Hatha yoga	Sexual
John Friend	1959–	Male	US		Anusara Yoga	Yes	Yes	No		Sexual; Financial
Gurmukh	1943–	Female	US	Yogi Bhajan	Kundalini Yoga	No	Yes		Yoga in pregnancy	
Gurumayi Chidvilasananda	1955–	Female	India	Muktananda	Siddha Yoga	No	Yes	Yes	Shaktipat, japa	
B. K. S. Iyengar	1918–2014	Male	India	Krishnamacharya	Iyengar Yoga	Yes	No	No	Yoga props	
Jaggi Vasudev	1957–	Male	India	Malladihalli Raghavendra	Isha Foundation	Yes	Yes		"Inner Engineering", japa, pranayama	
K. Pattabhi Jois	1915–2009	Male	India	Krishnamacharya	Ashtanga Vinyasa Yoga	Yes	No	No	Vinyasas	Sexual
Krishnamacharya	1888–1989	Male	India		Vinyasa Krama Yoga	Yes	No	No	Vinyasas	
Kriyananda	1926–2013	Male	US	Yogananda	Ananda yoga	No	Yes	Yes		Copyright disputes Sexual
Kuvalayananda	1883–1966	Male	India	Paramahamsa Madhavdas	Kaivalyadhama	Yes			Ayurveda	
Maharishi Mahesh Yogi	1918–2008	Male	India	Brahmananda Saraswati	Transcendental Meditation	No	Yes			
Meher Baba	1894–1969	Male	India		Avatar Meher Baba Trust	No			Sufism	
Dharma Mittra	1939–	Male	Brazil	Kailashananda	Dharma Yoga Center	Yes				
Muktananda	1908–1982	Male	India	Bhagawan Nityananda	Siddha Yoga	No	Yes		Shaktipat	Sexual
Nirmala Srivastava (Shri Mataji Nirmala Devi)	1923–2011	Female	India		Sahaja Yoga	No	Yes		Kundalini awakening	
Swami Rama	1925–1996	Male	India		Himalayan Institute	No	Yes			Sexual
Ram Dass	1931–2019	Male	US	Neem Karoli Baba		No	Yes		Pranayama	
Baba Ramdev	1965–	Male	India		Patanjali Yogpeeth	Yes	Yes		Ayurveda, pranayama	
Sivananda	1887–1963	Male	India		Divine Life Society	No	Yes			
Sri Sri Ravi Shankar	1956–	Male	India	Maharishi Mahesh Yogi	Art of Living Foundation	Yes	Yes		Sudarshan Kriya, pranayama	
Satchidananda Saraswati	1914–2002	Male	India	Sivananda	Integral Yoga	Yes	Yes	Yes	Pranayama, Karma Yoga, Jnana Yoga, Japa	Sexual
Sathya Sai Baba	1926–2011	Male	India		Sathya Sai Organization	No				
Shankarananda	1942–	Male	US		Shiva Yoga	No	Yes			Sexual
Vishnudevananda Saraswati	1927–1993	Male	India	Sivananda	Sivananda Yoga	Yes	Yes		Pranayama, Sattvic diet	Sexual
Vivekananda	1863–1902	Male	India	Ramakrishna	Vedanta	No	Yes			
Paramahansa Yogananda	1893–1952	Male	India	Sri Yukteswar Giri	Self-Realization Fellowship	Yes	Yes	Yes	Kriya Yoga	
Yogendra	1897–1989	Male	India		The Yoga Institute	Yes	Yes			

== Sources ==
- De Michelis, Elizabeth (2004). A History of Modern Yoga : Patañjali and Western Esotericism. Continuum Publishing. ISBN 978-0-8264-8772-8. OCLC 51942410.
- Gleig, Ann; Williamson, Lola, eds. (2013). Homegrown Gurus: from Hinduism in America to American Hinduism. Albany, New York: State University of New York Press. ISBN 978-1-4384-4792-6. OCLC 862746284.
- Jain, Andrea (2015). Selling Yoga: from Counterculture to Pop Culture. Oxford, England: Oxford University Press. ISBN 978-0-19-939024-3. OCLC 878953765.
- Jones, Constance A.; Ryan, James D. (2007). Encyclopedia of Hinduism. Encyclopedia of World Religions. J. Gordon Melton, Series Editor. New York: Facts On File. ISBN 978-0-8160-5458-9. Alt URL
- Leviton, Richard (March–April 1990). "Yoga in America: The First 100 Years". Yoga Journal (91): 40–.
- Schneider, Carrie (2003). American Yoga: The Paths and Practices of America's Greatest Yoga Masters. Barnes & Noble. ISBN 978-0-7607-4558-8.
- Shearer, Alistair (2020). The Story of Yoga: From Ancient India to the Modern West. London: Hurst Publishers. ISBN 978-1-78738-192-6.
- Singleton, Mark; Goldberg, Ellen (2014). Gurus of Modern Yoga. Oxford: Oxford University Press. ISBN 978-0199938728.
- Syman, Stefanie (2010). The Subtle Body: The Story of Yoga in America. New York: Farrar, Straus, and Giroux. ISBN 978-0-374-23676-2.
