= Ganeshpur =

Ganesapura may refer to:

- Ganeshpur, Bhandara, Maharashtra, India
- Ganeshpur, Punjab, India
- Ganeshpur, Chanditala-I, Hooghly district, West Bengal, India
  - Ganeshpur Bharta, a "twin village" of which this is part
- Ganesapuram, a hamlet in the village of Vilpatti, Tamil Nadu, India
- Ganeshpur, Syangja, Gandaki, Nepal
- Ganeshpur, Kapilvastu, Lumbini, Nepal
- Ganeshpur, Dadeldhura, Mahakali, Nepal
- Ganeshpur, Pachperwa, Uttar Pradesh

== See also ==
- Ganeshpuri (disambiguation)
