= Bharta =

Bharta may refer to:

== Geography ==
=== India ===
- Bharta, Hoshiarpur, a census village in Hoshiarpur district in the state of Punjab, India.
- Bharta Khurd, a village in Shaheed Bhagat Singh Nagar district of Punjab State, India.
- Bharta Kalan, a village in Shaheed Bhagat Singh Nagar district of Punjab State, India.
- Ganeshpur Bharta, a census village in Hoshiarpur district in the state of Punjab, India.

=== Nepal ===
- Bharta, Nepal, a village development committee in Kalikot district in the Karnali Zone of north-western Nepal.
- Bharta Pundyadevi, a village development committee in Makwanpur district in the Narayani Zone of southern Nepal.

== Dish ==
- Baingan bharta
- Bhurta, also called bharta, an Indian dish of seasoned mashed vegetables
