= Mark Griffin (spiritual teacher) =

American sculptor

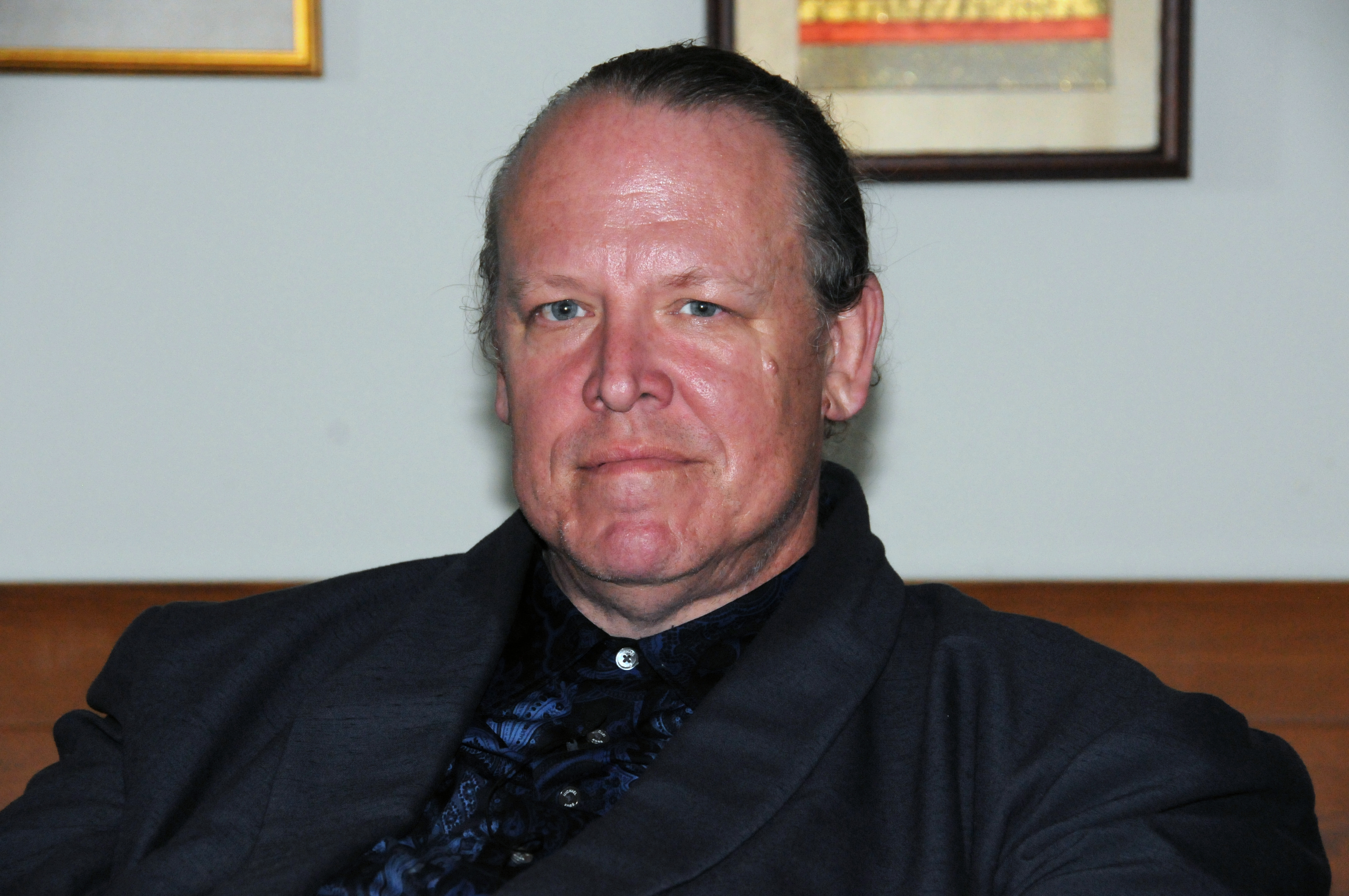

Personal life
- Born: August 28, 1954 Tacoma, Washington, United States
- Died: October 24, 2018 (aged 64) Santa Monica, California, United States
- Website: www.hardlight.org

Religious life
- Religion: Hinduism

Religious career
- Teacher: Swami Muktananda Paramahamsa, Kalu Rinpoche

Mark Griffin (August 28, 1954 - October 24, 2018) was an American spiritual teacher in the lineage of Bhagawan Nityananda. Griffin was an author on the philosophy and practice of Yoga Tantra. He emphasizes spiritual practice (sadhana), especially meditation. He was the founder and director of Hard Light Center of Awakening, a Los Angeles-based spiritual school that, according to its literature, offers intensive training in meditation and other practical techniques of Liberation. He was also an artist.

== Biography ==
Born Mark Edson Griffin, son of engineer Jack Griffin and Barbara Griffin. Griffin attended the San Francisco Conservatory of Music from 1976 to 1979, and the Academy of Art University in San Francisco, and has made art continuously ever since. In 1976, at the age of 21 he met his Guru, Swami Muktananda Paramahamsa, the disciple of Bhagawan Nityananda of Ganeshpuri.

He spent 7 years studying meditation with Muktananda, mostly in his Oakland Ashram, in California. He subsequently spent 6 years studying meditation with Kalu Rinpoche.

In 1989 he founded the Hard Light School of Awakening of Los Angeles, California.

== Teachings and Philosophy ==
=== Shaktipat Guru ===
Griffin said that within every person lies the dormant power of kundalini shakti, the evolutionary power of the Universe. This potential can be awakened by means of the grace of the Guru and through spiritual practice or shaktipat.

=== Yoga Tantra ===
Griffin’s spiritual training techniques included: flexibility of attention, breath, insight, mind-training involving concentration, discrimination, mantra and meditation.

Griffin also taught that the human form consists of not one, but four interlinked bodies: the physical body of flesh, the subtle body of energy, the causal body of mind, and the supra-causal body of Universal Consciousness.

=== Sadhana ===
Sadhana refers to everything an aspirant does on the spiritual path in furtherance of reaching Liberation. The sadhana practices that Griffin teaches include meditation, repetition of the lineage mantra (Om Namah Shivaya or So-Ham), service, study, darshan, satsang, and recitation of the Guru Gita.

== Service ==
In 2005, Griffin formed a non-profit called Third Millennium Awakening (TMA), with a sister charity in India, Shree Nityananda Education Trust (SNET). The mission of TMA and SNET is to further charitable work in Maharashtra, India. TMA and SNET have been making bio-sand water filters that are distributed free of charge to needy families in the area surrounding the Fire Mountain Retreat Center in Nimboli. The eventual goal is to provide clean drinking water to everyone who lacks it in all of Maharashtra state.

== Art ==
In 2005, Griffin raised a sculpture at Burning Man called Ladder, a functional aluminum and steel ladder 108 feet tall, that was described as "staggering" by author Jessica Bruder in her book "Burning Book, A Visual History of Burning Man". In 2009 Griffin was invited by Kirsha Kaechele to exhibit the Ladder sculpture at the Voodoo Experience in New Orleans. In 2008 Griffin was invited by Lydia Takeshita of LA Artcore, to show his large scale photographic works in both Thailand and Japan. In 2011 Lydia Takeshita staged a one-man exhibition of Mark's work, entitled: Dream Red Body, at the LA Artcore Union Center for the Arts. The city of Songkhla, Thailand commissioned Griffin to do a large-scale sculpture, and the Fukuoka Asian Art Museum purchased one of his works for its permanent collection.

== Bibliography ==
Mark Griffin is the author of the following books:

- Mark Griffin (2008). Shri Guru Gita: 108 Sutras for Awakening. Hard Light Pub. ISBN 978-0-9759020-6-6."
- Mark Griffin (2012). Shaktipat - The Doorway to Enlightenment. Hard Light Publishing. ISBN 978-0-9819375-0-2.
- Mark Griffin (2008). Spiritual Power. HARD LIGHT PUB. ISBN 978-0-9759020-9-7.
- Mark Griffin (2008). The Bardo Thodol - A Golden Opportunity. Hard Light Pub. ISBN 978-0-9759020-2-8.
- Samadhi Kunda ISBN 0-9759020-1-6
- Mark Griffin (2004). 108 Discourses On Awakening. Hard Light Pub. ISBN 978-0-9759020-0-4.

== Books About Griffin ==
- Sangha Speaks ISBN 0-9759020-1-6
