= Siddha Yoga =

Type of yoga

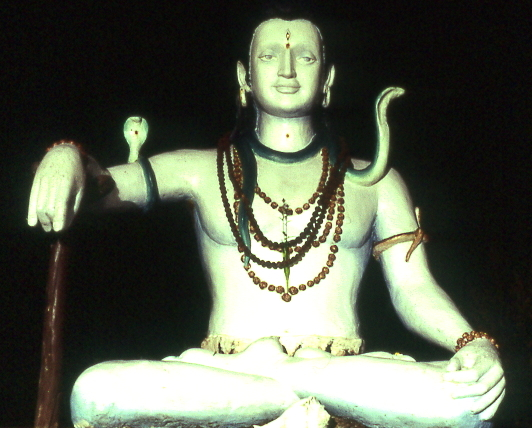
Shiva statue, Shree Muktananda Ashram, New York

Siddha Yoga is a spiritual path founded by Swami Muktananda (1908–1982). According to its literature, the Siddha Yoga tradition is "based mainly on eastern philosophies" and "draws many of its teachings from the Indian yogic texts of Vedanta and Kashmir Shaivism, the Bhagavad Gita and the poet-saints." The present head of Siddha Yoga is Gurumayi Chidvilasananda.

Ashrams and meditation centers provide places to learn and practice Siddha Yoga. The two main ashrams are Gurudev Siddha Peeth in Ganeshpuri, India, and Shree Muktananda Ashram in New York State, United States. Siddha Yoga has meditation centers in several countries, including India, the United States, Australia, United Kingdom, France, Belgium, Germany, Italy, Canada, Mexico, Brazil and Japan.

== Etymology ==
"Siddha Yoga" ("perfect" or "perfected" yoga) is a Sanskrit term adopted by Muktananda to describe the path of self-realization that he embarked on under the guidance of his spiritual teacher, the Indian saint Bhagawan Nityananda. Muktananda regarded the path he learned from his teacher as a perfect path because it embraced all of the traditional yogas (jnana yoga, karma yoga, raja yoga, and bhakti yoga), spontaneously bringing the disciple to perfection in each. In 1975 Muktananda founded the SYDA Foundation (Siddha Yoga Dham Associates) to administer the work of his global "meditation revolution".

"Siddha Yoga" has been a registered service mark of the SYDA Foundation, a domestic non-profit corporation, since 1977. As an educational service mark, it is used in teaching and conducting workshops for individual spiritual development.

The ancient generic Sanskrit term "Siddha Yoga" is attested in the Third Tantra of the Tirumantiram of Tirumular, a Tamil poet of the 7th or 8th century A definition of "Siddha Yoga" is also offered by Swami Shankar Purushottam Tirtha, a yogi from the dual Tirtha/Siddhayoga lineage, who wrote two books on "Siddhayoga" in the early 1900s:

The easy way of attaining it (salvation) is said to be Siddhayoga... Siddhayoga or Siddhimarga is that means by which yoga can be attained without difficulty... Siddhayoga is attained by the infusion of spiritual force through the good grace of a saintly preceptor... Siddhayoga or Siddhimarga is nothing but the knowledge of the unity of Self and Brahma...

A further definition of "Siddha Yoga" was offered in 1948 by Swami Purushottam Tirtha's disciple, Swami Vishnu Tirtha:

Therefore the yoga of Kundalini is known as Mahayoga. It is also sometimes called Siddhayoga because it can be acquired only through the favor of a perfect master (Siddha Guru), without any effort on the part of the initiated.

It has been said that through shaktipat Kundalini is soon awakened, and that Mahayoga or Siddhayoga is the direct outcome.

== Teachings and practices ==
Muktananda's Siddha Yoga is based on his personal selection "from the teachings of his guru, Nityananda, and philosophical and practical traditions that preceded him, especially premodern hatha yoga, Vedanta, and Kashmir Shaivism." (Note: The Siddha Yoga tradition is "based mainly on eastern philosophies," and "draws many of its teachings from the Indian yogic texts of Vedanta and Kashmir Shaivism, the Bhagavad Gita and the poet-saints.")

The Siddha Yoga practices are intended to help the seeker "touch and expand the inner mystical state, until over time he or she becomes established in his experience of yoga or oneness with God."

=== Yoga practices ===
Siddha Yoga meditation, or the practice of turning the attention inward, involves silently focusing the attention on a mantra and on the flow of breath. The principal Siddha Yoga meditation mantra is Om Namah Shivaya.

Siddha Yoga chanting involves the use of music and sacred mantras "to enter into a dialogue with the divine." There are two main types of Siddha Yoga chants: namasankirtana (lyrical chanting of Sanskrit mantras, typically the names of God), and swadhyaya (the chanting of longer Sanskrit scriptural texts). Scriptural texts chanted in Siddha Yoga ashrams and meditation centers include the morning and evening Arati; the Guru Gita, a hymn of 182 verses transmitted in the Skanda Purana; Shree Rudram, an ancient hymn to Rudra (Shiva) preserved in the Krishna Yajurveda; and the Kundalini Stavah, an eight-stanza hymn to Kundalini.

Siddha Yoga students can participate in satsang, group meetings or programs held weekly at Siddha Yoga ashrams and meditation centers. Satsangs typically include talks, chanting, and meditation. The SYDA Foundation offers a variety of courses and retreats throughout the year, including the meditation intensives first developed by Muktananda in the 1970s.

Siddha Yoga students engage in seva, or "selfless service", as a spiritual practice. Students can practice seva through volunteer work at an ashram or a meditation center in their city. The work of the SYDA Foundation is carried out by the work of "sevites".

Other Siddha Yoga practices include japa (mantra repetition), contemplation, and dakshina, the traditional practice of making a voluntary monetary offering to a saint as an expression of gratitude for the grace and teachings one is said to have received.

=== Shaktipat ===
A central element of the Siddha Yoga path is shaktipat-diksha, literally translated as "initiation by descent of divine power," through which a seeker's Kundalini Shakti is awakened God-realization by the Guru. Once active, this inner power is said to support the seeker's steady efforts to attain self-realization. (Note: The Siddha Yoga vision statement is, "For everyone, everywhere, to realize the presence of divinity in themselves and creation, the cessation of all miseries and suffering, and the attainment of supreme bliss." The Siddha Yoga mission statement reads, "To constantly impart the knowledge of the Self. (Shiva Sutras III.28))

=== Holy days ===
Students of Siddha Yoga celebrate two major Hindu religious holy days: Maha Shivaratri (celebrated two days before the new moon in February/March) and Guru Purnima (celebrated on the full moon in July–August). They also celebrate the birthdays of Muktananda and Chidvilasananda; Muktananda's divya diksha day (the day he received initiation); and the mahasamadhi anniversaries of Muktananda and Bhagawan Nityananda.

== History ==
=== Muktananda ===
==== India ====
Bhagawan Nityananda's Samadhi shrine, Ganeshpuri

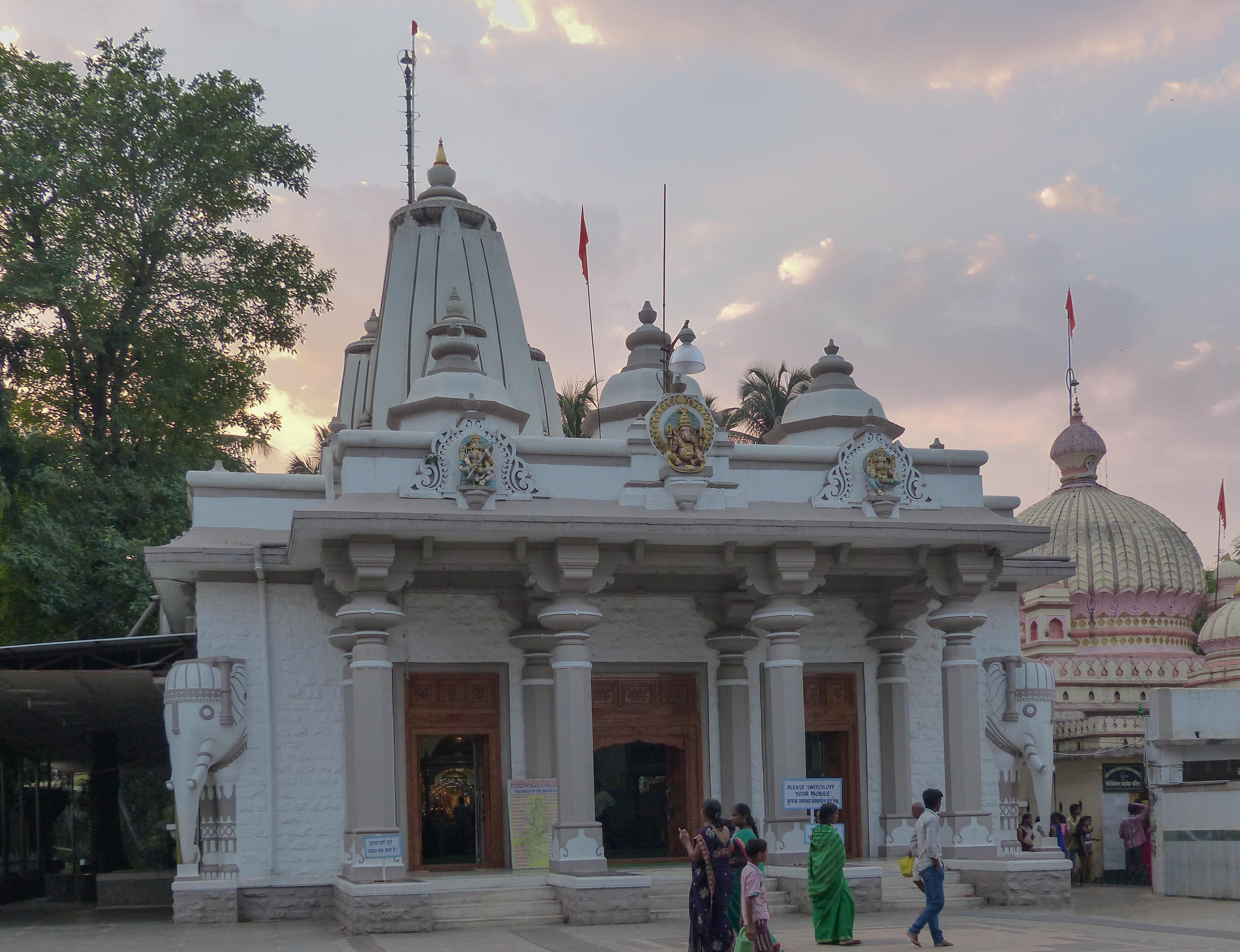
Exterior

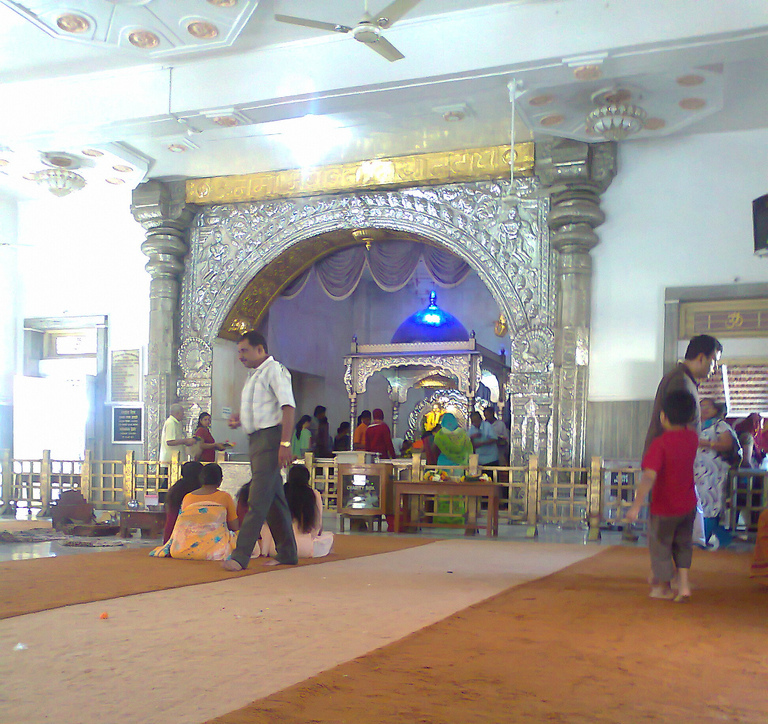
Interior

Muktananda's spiritual teacher, Bhagawan Nityananda, was born in South India. He first came to Ganeshpuri, a small village located 82 kilometers north of Mumbai, in 1936, settling there in a small hut built for him by the caretakers of the local Shiva temple. As his visitors and devotees increased in number, the hut expanded into an ashram. In his autobiography, Play of Consciousness, Muktananda describes how he received shaktipat initiation from Nityananda on August 15, 1947, and how he attained moksha or God-realization after nine more years of sadhana and discipleship. Nityananda installed Muktananda in a small three-room dwelling in Gavdevi, a mile from Ganeshpuri. After his death in 1961, Nityananda's Ganeshpuri ashram was converted into a samadhi shrine and has subsequently become a renowned temple and pilgrimage site. Under Muktananda's leadership the three-room dwelling in Gavdevi expanded into a flourishing ashram and international retreat site (Sri Gurudev Ashram, now Gurudev Siddha Peeth).

==== United States ====
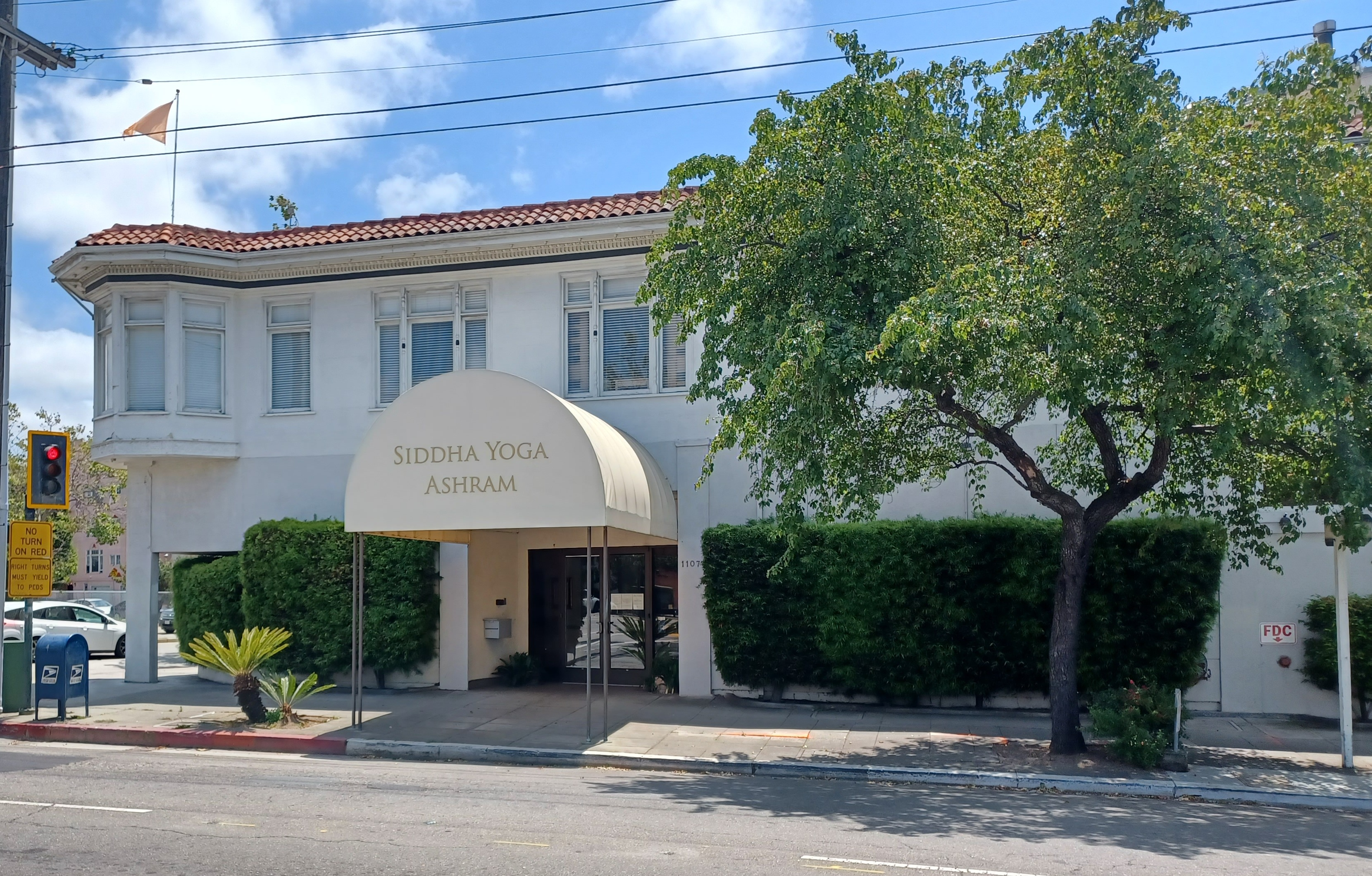
Oakland Ashram, California

From August 27 to 30, 1974, Muktananda led the first Shaktipat Intensive in Aspen, Colorado. Through Shaktipat Intensives, created by Muktananda, participants are said to receive shaktipat initiation (the awakening of Kundalini Shakti that is said to reside within a person) and to deepen their practice of Siddha Yoga meditation. Historically, Shaktipat initiation had been reserved for the few who had done many years of spiritual service and practices; Muktananda offered this initiation to newcomers and yogis alike.

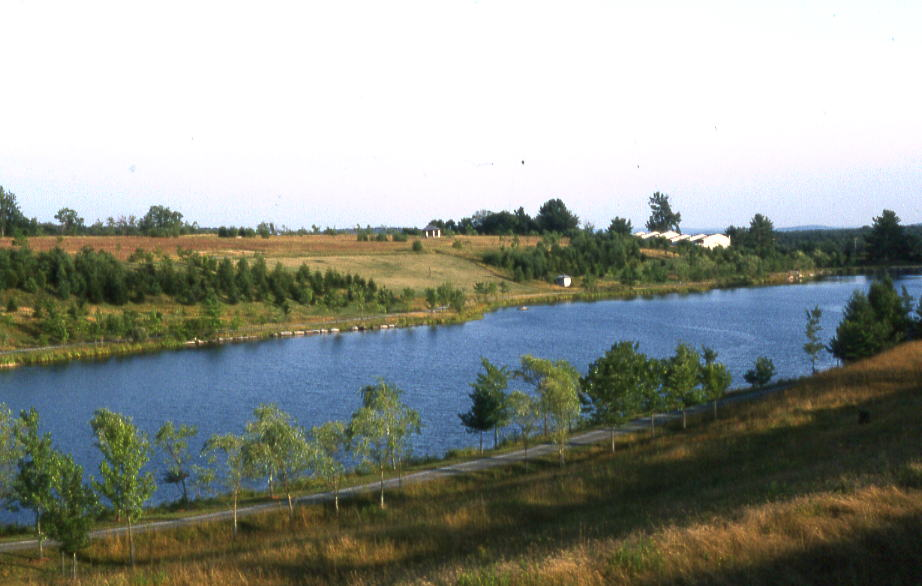
Lake Nityananda, Shree Muktananda Ashram, New York State

In 1974, Muktananda founded the SYDA Foundation, an organization designated to protect, preserve and facilitate the dissemination of the Siddha Yoga teachings. In 1975 Muktananda founded the Siddha Yoga Ashram in Oakland in the San Francisco Bay Area, and in 1976 he established Shree Nityananda Ashram (now Shree Muktananda Ashram) in the former Gilbert Hotel, South Fallsburg in the Catskills Mountains, north of New York City. His fame increased to the point that he was made the subject of a New York magazine article ("Hanging out with the Guru") and a Time magazine article ("Instant Energy"), both in 1976. In 1979, Muktananda created The Prison Project, designed to making the teachings, practices and experience of the Siddha Yoga path available to incarcerated seekers.

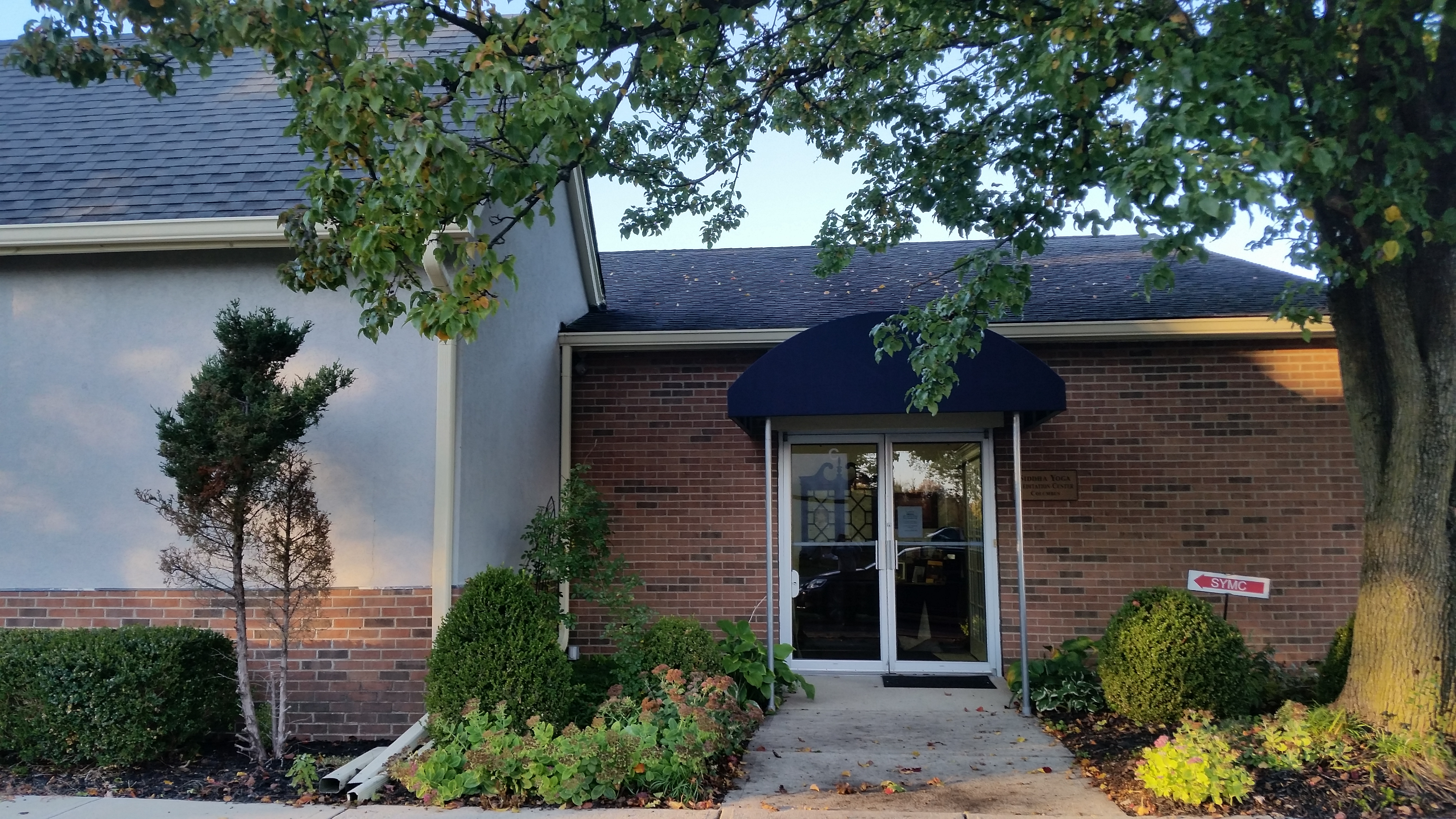
Meditation center, Columbus, Ohio

==== Death ====
Muktananda died on October 2, 1982. He appointed Gurumayi and Subhash Shetty as co-gurus of Siddha Yoga.

=== Subhash Shetty ===
Subhash Shetty (now known as Mahamandaleshwar Nityananda) is the former co-guru and spiritual leader of the Siddha Yoga path. He was appointed by Muktananda along with his sister.

In 1985, Gurumayi's brother Nityananda stepped down "in disputed circumstances", in which he and Gurumayi "messily parted ways". In October 1985 he had his sannyasa vows revoked. He later told a journalist this was because he had broken his celibacy vow. A different version of the events was reported later, that there had been a battle for succession and Nityananda was forced to leave. In 1987, Nityananda started his own organization, Shanti Mandir. Both it and Shankarananda's Shiva Yoga have been described as schisms from Siddha Yoga.

=== Gurumayi ===
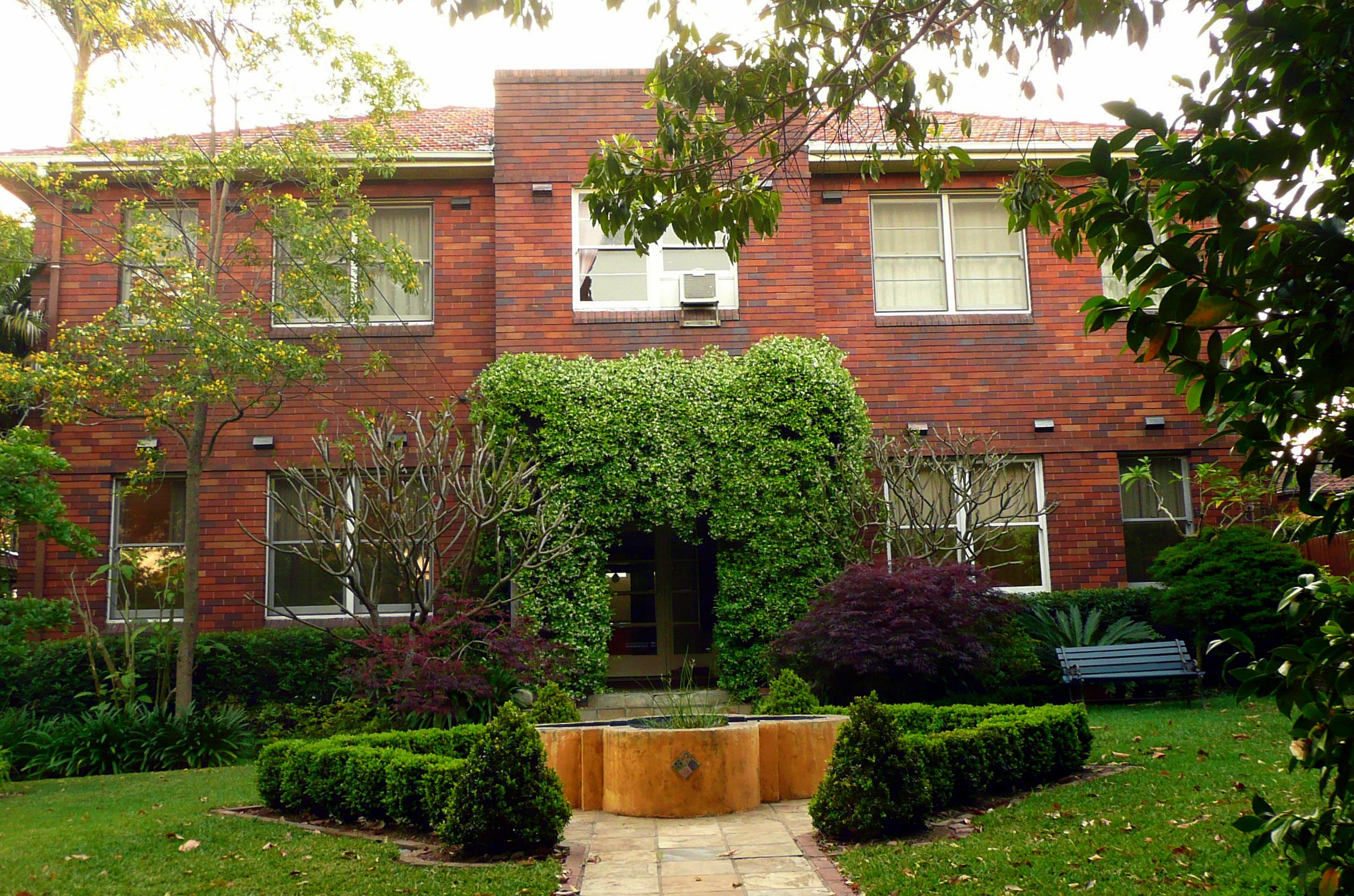
Sydney Ashram

One of Muktananda's earliest and principal disciples was Malti Shetty, a young woman from Mumbai who accompanied him as his English language interpreter on his second and third World Tours. In May 1982, Muktananda installed Shetty (now known as Gurumayi Chidvilasananda or Gurumayi) along with her brother as a co-guru and spiritual leader of the Siddha Yoga path. Gurumayi is the sole spiritual leader of Siddha Yoga since her brother's removal.

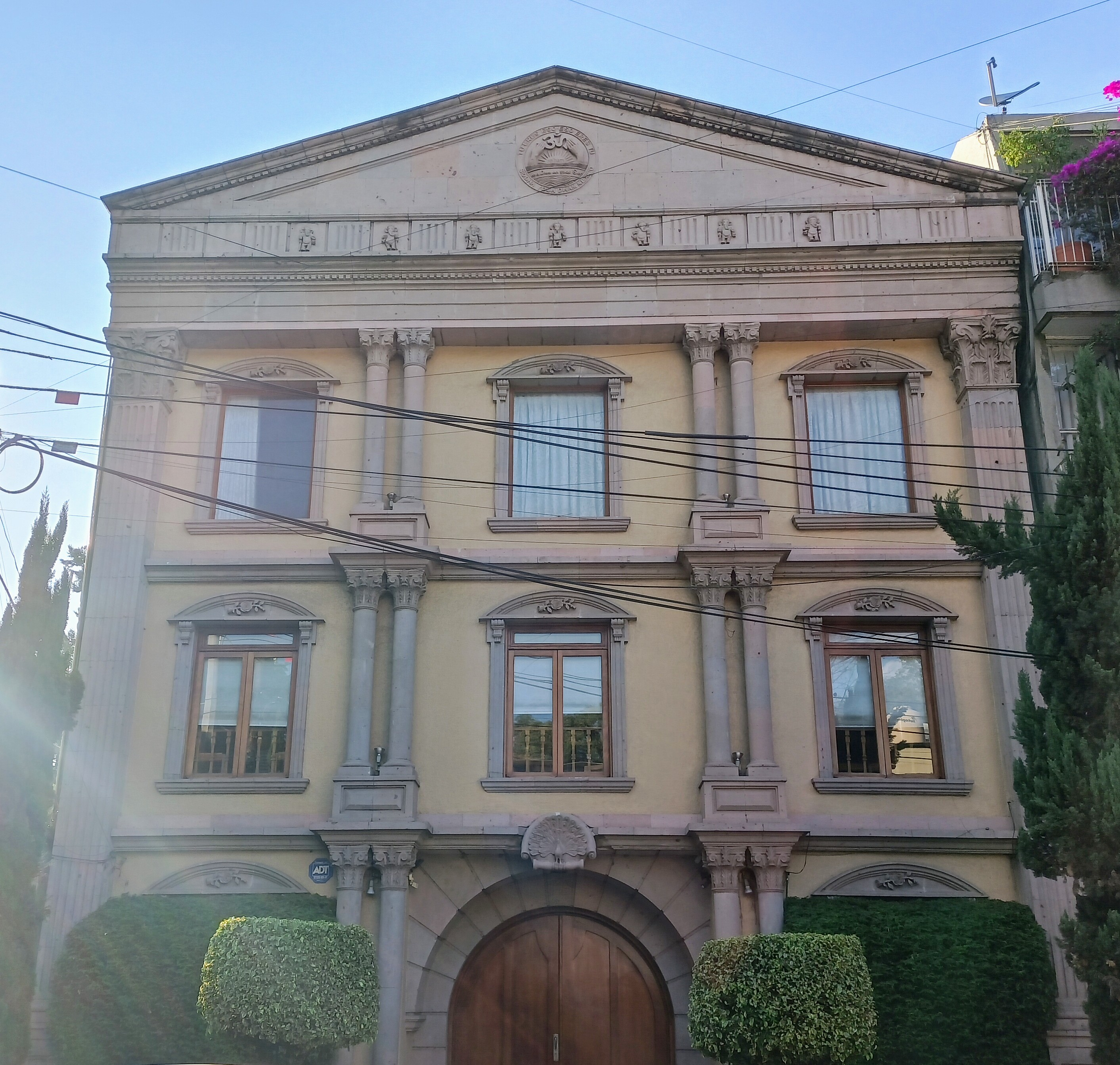
Mexico City Ashram

In 1992, Gurumayi's humanitarian initiative, the PRASAD Project, was incorporated in the United States. The project is an NGO in Special Consultative Status with the Economic and Social Council of the United Nations. It assists "people to achieve lives of self-reliance and dignity by offering programs of health, education and sustainable community development in India, dental care in the United States and eye care in Mexico." In the treatment of cataracts, PRASAD de Mexico has "performed free eye surgery on 26,087 adults and children."

In 1997, Gurumayi founded the Muktabodha Indological Research Institute with its own publishing imprint, Agama Press. The mission of Muktabodha, based on Gurumayi's original intention for the organization in 1997, is "to preserve endangered texts from the religious and philosophical traditions of classical India and make them accessible for study and scholarship worldwide."

=== Moving online ===
In 2004, SYDA changed its focus from large events at its South Fallsburg ashram to bringing programs to where its followers lived. It stated this was to increase accessibility. The ashram staff was cut, and the Sadhana Kutir dormitory and office building (the former Windsor Hotel) was sold. Before 2008, the Ganeshpuri ashram had allowed Western backpackers to drop in for short stays and welcomed Indian visitors on weekends. Subsequently, only visits to its Nityananda temple and Muktananda's shrine were permitted.

In 2011, the website was reworked to become the primary means of disseminating teachings and events. In 2013, the website began to livestream video programs. In 2020, in response to the global COVID-19 pandemic, Gurumayi started speaking in frequent livestreamed video satsangs. As of 2021, students may visit the ashrams only to offer short-term (less than six months) or long-term (six months or more) service, or to attend pre-booked retreats.

== Controversy ==
In 1981, Stan Trout, a swami for Siddha Yoga, wrote an open letter in which he referred a number of stories of Muktananda engaging in sexual activities with young women, and using Sidda Yoga members to harass and make death threats to force people to "stop talking about your escapades with young girls in your bedroom." This included mention of former members being granted a restraining order against Muktananda and Siddha Yoga members. In 1983 William Rodarmor printed several allegations in CoEvolution Quarterly from anonymous female devotees that Muktananda regularly raped them. In the article, based on twenty five interviews, former devotees charged that Muktananda had engaged in rape of many women including underage devotees. In 1996 former devotees started a website entitled Leaving Siddha Yoga to express their grievances against Siddha Yoga. Lis Harris repeated and extended Rodarmor's allegations in an article in The New Yorker (1994).

According to Lola Williamson, "Muktananda stressed the value of celibacy for making progress on the spiritual path, but he almost certainly violated his own rules." Sarah Caldwell, in an essay in the academic journal Nova Religio (2001), argued that Muktananda was a practitioner of Shakta Tantrism, but also "whatever Baba was doing, claiming it to be a form of Tantric initiation, seemed rather to retain only the bodily shell of a Tantric practice".

In November 2023 a lawsuit was filed in New York against the Siddha Yoga organization Syda Foundation on behalf of 3 plaintiffs. The lawsuit alleges a series of abuses by Swami Muktanada including rape and sexual assault during the 1970s and early 80s.

== Analysis ==
The personal quality of purity is emphasized in the Siddha Yoga tradition; the scholar of religion Karen Pechilis writes that Gurumayi's purity is highlighted to show that she continues the guru tradition, and that she is a suitably pure person to be the spiritual leader of the organization. Pechilis comments that while purity may have been an implicit credential for her predecessor gurus, one point of view would be that it became "explicit and greatly emphasized during the succession dispute and is now a primary lens" for understanding Gurumayi's spiritual path; unusually for female gurus, Pechilis writes, she was not apparently expected to marry at any time, and instead she took sannyasa in the way a male guru would.

John Paul Healy, who had been a devotee from 1981 to 1985, analysed the sociology of 32 former Siddha Yoga devotees. Some of the participants had moved to one or another of the two groups which split off from Siddha Yoga, Swami Nityananda's Shanti Mandir and Shankarananda's Shiva Yoga; they were moved to leave by the death of Muktananda, the changing leadership and the allegations that Muktananda had had sexual interactions with devotees, as well as changes in their own lives. Healy found that the brainwashing theory of conversion to cults did not apply to Siddha Yoga, but that people joined and stayed because they found the practice attractive, from the aromatic incense, the diet and lifestyle, the group meditation and chanting, and the experiences of the group, including of the guru. The changes within the organization after Muktananda's death have been examined by scholars including Gene Thursby and Douglas Osto.

The scholars Jeffrey Kripal and Sarah Caldwell write that the 1997 book Meditation Revolution, which includes five recognized scholars among its six authors, essentially legitimizes, systematizes, and canonizes Chidvilasanda's Siddha Yoga lineage. They state that this would be unexceptionable if presented as from devotees, but is problematic given their presentation of themselves as scholarly historians of religion.

The scholar of religion Catherine Wessinger comments that while devotees are varied, many are "upwardly mobile", and that the path seems to attract people from Jewish and Roman Catholic backgrounds. She writes that Catholics will find many familiar features, such as venerated images of saints; the use of the rosary or mala to count repetitions of mantras; celibate "ministers" in distinctive robes; "uplifting congregational singing; elaborate and beautiful worship and places of worship; and finally, a strong authority figure ... who[m] devotees believe is able to perform miracles in response to needs".

== Sources ==
Primary

- Brooks, Douglas Renfrew (1997). Meditation Revolution: A History and Theology of the Siddha Yoga Lineage. Durgananda, Swami; Muller-Ortega, Paul; Mahony, William; Rhodes-Bailly, Constantina; Sabharathnam, S. P. Agama Press. pp. xix–l. ISBN 978-0-9654096-0-5.
- Muktananda, Swami (1971). Play of Consciousness. SYDA Foundation. ISBN 978-0-914602-37-8.
- SYDA (1990) [1972]. The Nectar of Chanting. SYDA Foundation. ISBN 978-0-914602-16-3.
- Tirtha, Swami Vishnu (1948). Devatma Shakti (Kundalini) Divine Power. India: Yoga Shri Peeth Trust. 1st edition (in English)
- Tirumular (1991). Tirumantiram. India: Sri Ramakrishna Matt. ISBN 978-81-7120-383-3., Second edition. (in Tamil, translated to English by Dr. B. Natarajan)
- Tirtha, Swami Shankar Purushottam (1990). Yoga Vani: Instructions for the Attainment of Siddhayoga. New York: Sat Yuga Press. First English edition. First published the early 1900s in Bengali and Hindi.
- Tirtha, Swami Shankar Purushottam (1995). Guru Vani: 100 Ways to Attain Inner Peace. New York: Sat Yuga Press. First English edition. First published the early 1900s in Bengali and Hindi.
- White, John Warren (1990). Kundalini, Evolution and Enlightenment. New York: Paragon House. ISBN 978-1-55778-303-5. Paul Zweig writes of his experience of receiving Shaktipat from Swami Muktananda in this anthology.

Secondary

- Caldwell, Sarah (2001), "The Heart of the Secret: A Personal and Scholarly Encounter with Shakta Tantrism in Siddha Yoga", Nova Religio, 5 (1): 9–51, doi:10.1525/nr.2001.5.1.9, JSTOR 10.1525/nr.2001.5.1.9, S2CID 143965805
- Harris, Lis (14 November 1994). "O Guru, Guru, Guru". The New Yorker. pp. 92–93. Archived from the original on 2 June 2021.
- Healy, John Paul (2008). Attraction, Affiliation and Disenchantment in a New Religious Movement: A Study of Individuals' Experiences in a Siddha Yoga Practice. University of New South Wales (PhD thesis). Archived from the original on 2021-10-06.
- Healy, John Paul (2010). Yearning to Belong: Discovering a New Religious Movement. Ashgate Publishing. ISBN 978-1-4094-1941-9.
- Healy, John Paul (2010b). "Schisms of Swami Muktananda's Siddha Yoga". Marburg Journal of Religion. 15 (1): 1–15. ISSN 1612-2941. Archived from the original on 2023-03-28.
- Jain, Andrea R. (2014). "Muktananda: Entrepreneurial Godman, Tantric hero". In Singleton, Mark; Goldberg, Ellen (eds.). Gurus of Modern Yoga. Oxford University Press.
- Jain, Andrea R. (2015). Selling Yoga: From Counterculture to Pop Culture. Oxford University Press.
- Kripal, Jeffrey J. (1999). "Inside-Out, Outside-In. Existential Place and Academic Practice in the Study of North American Guru-Traditions". Religious Studies Review. 24 (3): 233–238.
- Osto, Douglas (2020). "4. Swami Muktananda and the Siddha Yoga legacy". An Indian Tantric Tradition and Its Modern Global Revival. Routledge.
- Pechilis, Karen (2004). "Gurumayi, the Play of Shakti and Guru". The Graceful Guru: Hindu Female Gurus in India and the United States. Oxford University Press. pp. 219–243. ISBN 0-19-514538-0.
- Pechilis, Karen (2015). "Women Gurus in Hinduism" (PDF). Prabuddha Bharata. 120 (6): 400–409. Archived (PDF) from the original on 2021-10-06. "Gurumayi, and Ammachi notably deploy technology, including the Internet, in transmitting their teachings."
- Rodarmor, William (1983). "The Secret Life of Swami Muktananda" (PDF). CoEvolution Quarterly. Archived (PDF) from the original on 2021-08-21.
- Syman, Stefanie (2010). The Subtle Body : the Story of Yoga in America. Farrar, Straus and Giroux. pp. 285–289. ISBN 978-0-374-53284-0. OCLC 456171421.
- Thursby, Gene (1991). "Siddha Yoga: Swami Muktananda and the Seat of Power". In Miller, Timothy (ed.). When Prophets Die: The Postcharismatic Fate Of New Religious Movements. Albany: State University of New York Press. pp. 165–182. ISBN 978-0-7914-0717-2.
- Urban, Hugh B. (2012). The Cult of Ecstasy: Meldings of East and West in a New Age of Tantra, in the book Tantra: Sex, Secrecy, Politics, and Power in the Study of Religion. University of California Press. pp. 203–263. JSTOR 10.1525/j.ctt1pp4mm.12. Archived from the original on 2023-03-28.
- Wessinger, Catherine (1993). "Woman guru, woman roshi: the legitimation of female religious leadership in Hindu and Buddhist groups in America". Women's leadership in marginal religions: Explorations outside the Mainstream (PDF). University of Illinois Press. pp. 125–146. ISBN 978-0-25206-332-9.
- Williamson, Lola (2010). Transcendent in America: Hindu-Inspired Meditation Movements as New Religion. New York University Press.
- Williamson, Lola (2011). "[Review]: Yearning to Belong: Discovering a New Religious Movement". Alternative Spirituality and Religion Review. 2 (1): 136–138. doi:10.5840/asrr20112143.
- Winternitz, Maurice (1972) [1927]. History of Indian Literature (Second revised reprint ed.). New Delhi: Oriental Books Reprint Corporation.
