= Shiva Ashram =

The Shiva Ashram was the home of Shiva Yoga, which was founded in 1991 by the director, Mahamandaleshwar Swami Shankarananda (Swamiji), and co-director Ma Devi Saraswati. Shiva Yoga traces its lineage to the Indian saints, Bhagawan Nityananda and Swami Muktananda.

The Shiva Ashram is a residential meditation and spiritual centre in Mount Eliza, on the Mornington Peninsula, Victoria, about one hour outside of Melbourne. The ashram was established in its present location in 1996.

Swami Shankarananda was the teacher in residence. There were 40 permanent residents, and many people came for short and long term visits from Melbourne, interstate and overseas to attend courses, retreats and teacher training programs.

In March 2015, Yoga Australia suspended accreditation to the Shiva Ashram following allegations of sexual abuse. Since then, the Ashram has gone into liquidation.

The organization was liquidated and Shankarananda resigned as director but continued as the spiritual leader, retaining ownership of the main property, now known as The Ashram Mount Eliza, where he continues to run regular programs for residents and the public.

== Shiva Ashram Grounds ==
The grounds of the Shiva Ashram have several feature gardens, principal among them an interfaith garden in which each of the world’s major religions is honoured. The ashram participated in the Australian Open Gardens scheme in 2012 and 2013.
