= Shankarananda =

Shankarananda may refer to:

- Shankarananda (Ramakrishna monk) (1880–1962), 7th president of the Ramakrishna Mission from 1952 to 1959
- Shankarananda (Shiva Yoga) (born 1942), American-born guru who founded an Australian ashram in 1991
