= Nishprapanchaya =

Nishprapanchaya is a description of one of the aspects of God, bliss, in the sequence "being, consciousness, bliss" in Hindu monotheism. As such it is sung daily in some Hindu temples and ashrams.

== Meaning ==
Nishprapanchaya (निष्प्रपञ्चाय niṣprapañcāya IPA: [nɪʂpɽɐpɐntɕaːjɐ]) is variously translated as "He is beyond world-consciousness", "He is transcendent", and "Who is above this world".

Grammatically, niṣprapañcāya is the dative of a Sanskrit noun, niṣprapañca, "unmanifest": niṣ- is the negative "without", pra-pañca means "manifest, of the world" and -ya is the dative suffix meaning "to" or "for".

Nishprapanchaya occurs in some popular mantras, as following Om Namah Shivaya (plus a string of datives giving qualities of Shiva), thus:

Om Namah Shivaya Gurave (oṃ namaḥ śivāya gurave) (Om. Salutations to the guru, who is Shiva.)
Satchidananda Murtaye, (saccidānanda mūrtaye) (His form is being, consciousness, and bliss.)
Nishprapanchaya Shantaya (niṣprapañcāya śantāya) (He is transcendent, calm,)
Niralambaya Tejase. (nirālambāya tejase) (free from all support, and luminous.)

Expounded in more detail, Muktananda glosses the second half of the verse as describing an "aspect of God, the inner Self", and meaning "Dwelling in everything as its inmost essence, the basis of love, supremely blissful, free from occupations and agitations (nishprapanchaya shantaya), he needs no other support (niralambaya) and yet he sustains and supports all.".

== Usage and context ==
Nishprapanchaya occurs in some forms of the Guru Stotram. A form of the Sri Guru Stotram is sung daily in the Shivananda Ashram, Rishikesh, India.
