= Shree Muktananda Ashram =

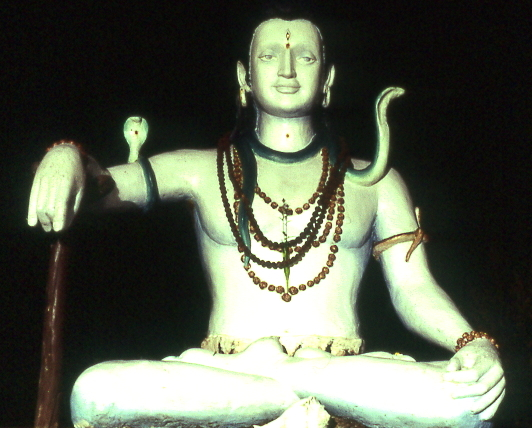
Shiva statue at night

Shree Muktananda Ashram, in the Catskills area of upstate New York, is owned and operated by the SYDA Foundation. Its purpose is to provide a location where students of Siddha Yoga can study the philosophy and culture of the Siddha Yoga path and follow its daily practices (known as sadhana). Shree Muktananda Ashram houses the headquarters of the SYDA Foundation, the organization that protects, preserves, and facilitates the dissemination of the Siddha Yoga teachings. The ashram is located in South Fallsburg, approximately 130 kilometres north-west of New York City.

== History ==
The ashram that is currently known as Shree Muktananda Ashram was founded by Swami Muktananda, who was the disciple of the Indian guru Bhagavan Nityananda and the guru of the current spiritual head of the Siddha Yoga path Swami Chidvilasananda. Between 1970 and 1981, Muktananda undertook three world tours, establishing Siddha Yoga ashrams and centers in several countries. During his third world tour, Muktananda inaugurated Shree Nityananda Ashram in honour of his guru Bhagawan Nityananda. After Swami Muktananda's death in 1982, his successor Gurumayi Chidvilasananda changed the name of the ashram to Shree Muktananda Ashram.

The early ashram was established in a former hotel. The SYDA (Siddha Yoga Dham Associates) Foundation -- established by Muktananda in 1974 as the administrative organization for Siddha Yoga -- bought the Gilbert Hotel, situated on Brickman Road, Fallsburg. Extensive renovations began and the site became the location of the offices that were to administer Siddha Yoga activities globally.

In the summer of 1979, Siddha Yoga devotees gathered for the first retreat in the former Gilbert Hotel. A former ballroom became a meditation room and a temple honoring Nityananda was built.

In 1983, another hotel in the area, the Windsor, was acquired and converted to dormitory accommodation and offices. This centre became known as Sadhana Kutir. This facility has since been sold. In 1985, construction began on a large open-air pavilion known as Shakti Mandapa, which was located behind the original hotel building, now known as Anugraha (divine grace). In the following year, the SYDA Foundation bought the Brickman Hotel, also on Brickman Road, which became known as Atma Nidhi (treasure of the soul). The ashram became a 550 acres (220 hectares) site.

From the inception of Shree Muktananda Ashram until 2004, the SYDA Foundation offered retreats and courses at the ashram. Since then, courses and retreats have been created by the SYDA Foundation at Shree Muktananda Ashram for dissemination globally via local Siddha Yoga centres and via the Internet.

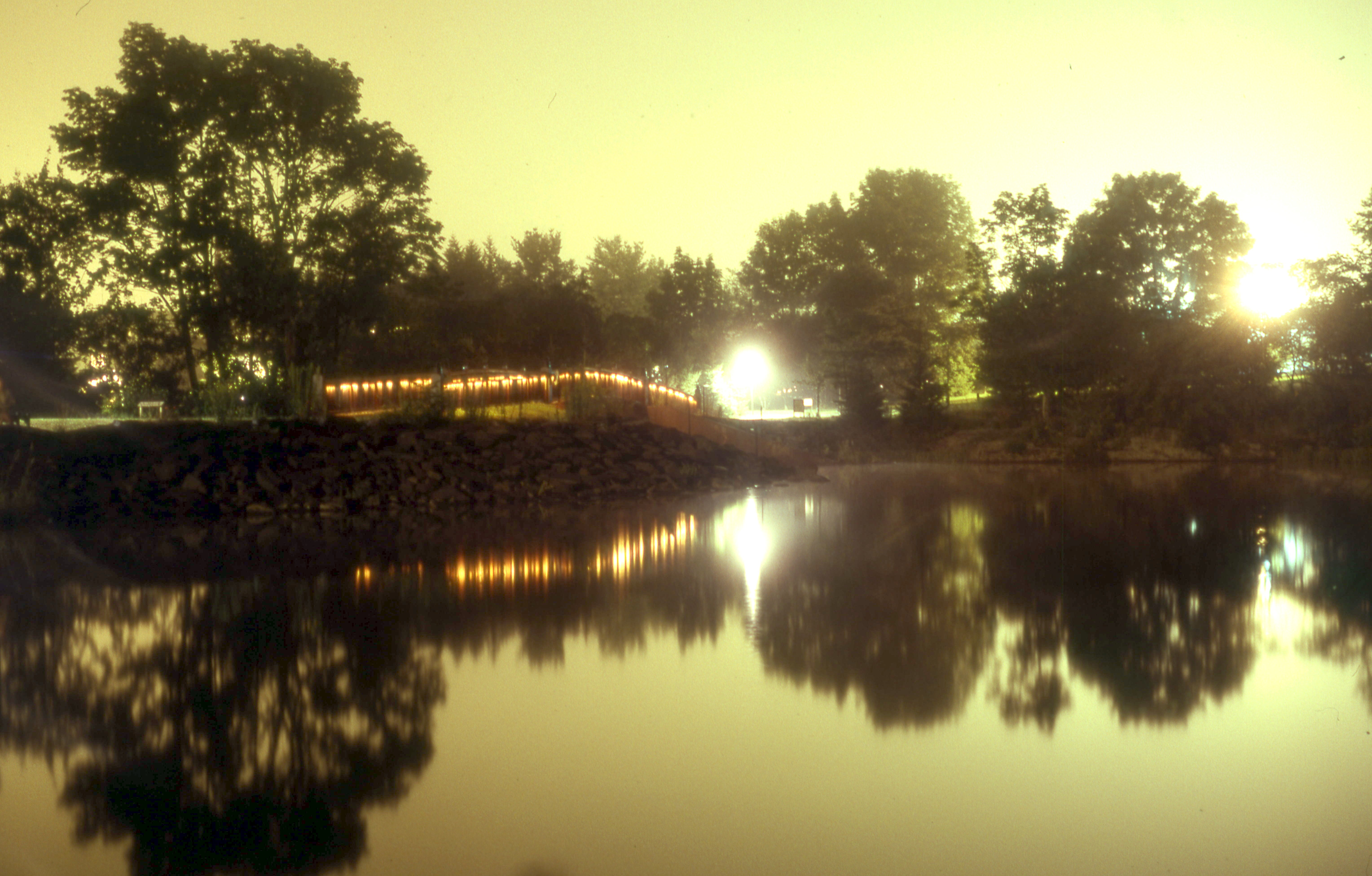
Lake Nityananda at night, Shree Muktananda Ashram

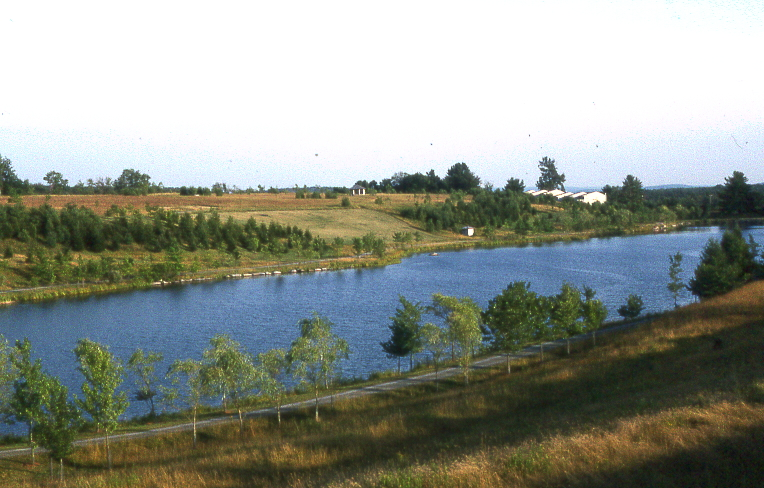
Lake Nityananda, late afternoon

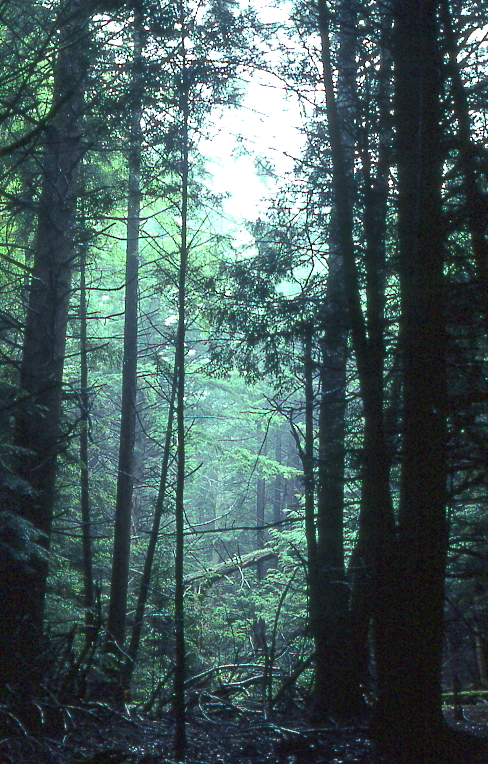
Pine forest near Atma Nidhi

== See also ==
- The Family (Australian New Age group)
