= Peeth =

Peeth may refer to:

- Gurudev Siddha Peeth, Indian ashram belonging to the Siddha Yoga organization
- Pitambara Peeth, complex of temples (including an Ashram)
- Sharada Peeth, located near Sharda, the famous temple of the goddess Sarasvatī (Sharda) in Northern Kashmir
- Tulsi Peeth, Indian religious and social service institution based in Chitrakoot, Madhya Pradesh, India
