= Siva Yoga =

Siva Yoga or Shiva Yoga may refer to:

- Mahamandaleshwar Swami Shankarananda (Shiva Yoga) (born 1942), an American-born guru
- Siva Yoga Nayaki, consort of the deity of the Tirupperunturai temple in India
- Siva Yoga, term used by a Yogic Guru in the Tamil Shaivite legend of Patanjali, a compiler of Yoga Sutras in the 2nd Century BCE
- Shiva yoga, a practice described in the Tirumandhiram, a Tamil poetic work written in the 5th century CE
