= Lalewal =

- Village
- Location in Punjab, India Lalewal (India)
- Coordinates: 31.0440639°N 76.0653341°E
- Country: India
- State: Punjab
- District: Shaheed Bhagat Singh Nagar

Government
  - Type: Panchayat raj
  - Body: Gram panchayat
- Elevation: 254 m (833 ft)

Population (2011)
  - Total: 139
- Sex ratio 69/70 ♂/♀

Languages
  - Official: Punjabi
- Time zone: UTC+5:30 (IST)
- PIN: 144518
- Telephone code: 01884
- ISO 3166 code: IN-PB
- Post office: Bharta Kalan (B.O)
- Website: nawanshahr.nic.in

Lalewal is a village in Shaheed Bhagat Singh Nagar district of Punjab State, India. It is located 550 meters away from postal branch office Bharta Kalan, 13.6 kilometres (8.5 mi) from Nawanshahr, 7.7 kilometres (4.8 mi) from district headquarter Shaheed Bhagat Singh Nagar and 94.5 kilometres (58.7 mi) from state capital Chandigarh. The village is administrated by Sarpanch an elected representative of the village.

== Demography ==
As of 2011, Lalewal has a total number of 29 houses and population of 139 of which 69 include are males while 70 are females according to the report published by Census India in 2011. The literacy rate of Lalewal is 55.56%, lower than the state average of 75.84%. The population of children under the age of 6 years is 22 which is 15.83% of total population of Lalewal, and child sex ratio is approximately 1750 as compared to Punjab state average of 846.

Most of the people are from Schedule Caste which constitutes 54.68% of total population in Lalewal. The town does not have any Schedule Tribe population so far.

As per the report published by Census India in 2011, 28 people were engaged in work activities out of the total population of Lalewal which includes 27 males and 1 females. According to census survey report 2011, 96.43% workers describe their work as main work and 3.57% workers are involved in Marginal activity providing livelihood for less than 6 months.

== Education ==
KC Engineering College and Doaba Khalsa Trust Group Of Institutions are the nearest colleges. Industrial Training Institute for women (ITI Nawanshahr) is 14 kilometres (8.7 mi). The village is 70 kilometres (43 mi) away from Chandigarh University, 53 kilometres (33 mi) from Indian Institute of Technology and 50 kilometres (31 mi) away from Lovely Professional University.

List of schools nearby:

- Dashmesh Model School, Kahma
- Govt Primary School, Kahlon
- Govt High School, Garcha

== Transport ==
Nawanshahr railway station is the nearest train station, However, Garhshankar Junction train station is 25 kilometres (16 mi) away from the village. Sahnewal Airport is the nearest domestic airport located 52 kilometres (32 mi) away in Ludhiana and the nearest international airport is located in Chandigarh also Sri Guru Ram Dass Jee International Airport is the second nearest airport which is 159 kilometres (99 mi) away in Amritsar.

== See also ==
- List of villages in India
