= Dhyanyogi Madhusudandas =

Indian yogi

Shri Dhyanyogi Madhusudandas
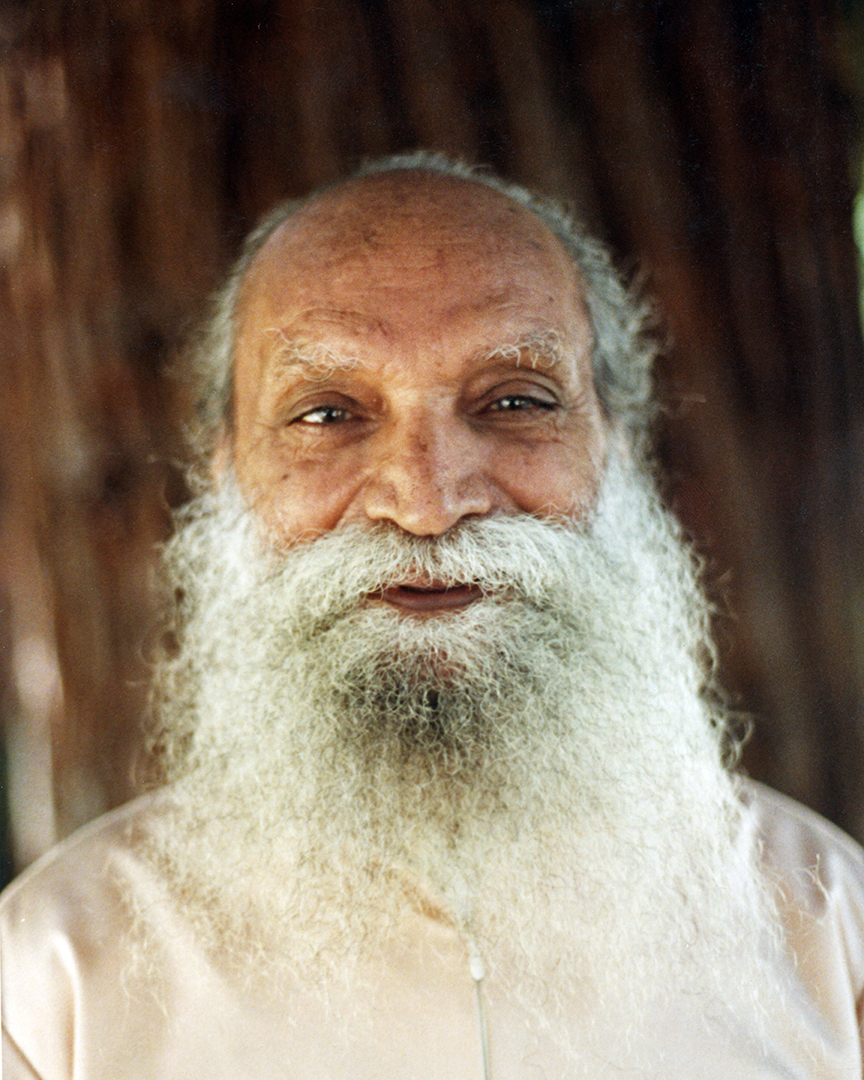

Personal life
- Born: Kashinath Mishra; 1878 (alleged) Bihar, India
- Died: 29 August 1994 Ahmedabad, India

Religious life
- Religion: Hinduism
- Philosophy: Kundalini Maha Yoga

Religious career
- Teacher: Shri Yogiraj Parameshawardasji

Quotation

All those who came to me for Shaktipat are worthy, and all of them are my spiritual heirs. For my energy works through them.

Shri Dhyanyogi Madhusudandas, also known as Kashinath and Madhusudandas, was an Indian yogi and author born in Bihar, India. His disciples included Shri Anandi Ma and Omdasji Maharaj. He was a master of Kundalini Maha Yoga who was responsible for popularising it in the United States.

Madhusudandas was born in the northern state of Bihar. He spent 37 years practicing yoga and at the age of 43 met his guru Parameshawardasji on Mount Abu where he received his Shaktipat initiation. He devoted his life to awakening the kundalini in spiritual seekers. He opened a hospital in Bihar and a school in Gujarat. Between 1976 and 1980 he lived in the United States and gave public kundalini awakening sessions. He was the founder of Dhyanyoga Centers, Inc.

Madhusudandas died on August 29, 1994, at the alleged age of 116.

== Selected publications ==
- Madhusudandas, Dhyanyogi (1968). Message To Disciples. Bombay: Shri Dhyanyogi Mandal.
- Dhyanyogi, Shri (1978). Light on Meditation: a Definitive Work on Kundalini and Raja Yoga. Dhyanyoga Centers, Incorporated. ISBN 9781883879006.
- Madhusudandas, Dhyanyogi (1979). Brahmanada: Sound, Mantra and Power. Dhyanyoga Centers, Incorporated.
- Madhusudandasji, Shri Dhyanyogi (1979). Death, Dying and Beyond Yoga. Dhyanyoga Centers, Incorporated. ISBN 1-883879-03-5.
- Madhusudandasji, Shri Dhyanyogi (1979). Yoga Dipika: Lamp of Yoga. NY: Dhyanyoga Centers, Incorporated. ISBN 1-883879-04-3.
- Madhusudandasji, Shri Dhyanyogi (2000). Shakti: An Introduction to Kundalini Maha Yoga. Antioch: Dhyanyoga Centers, Incorporated. ISBN 1-883879-08-6.
