= Guru Gita =

Hindu scripture

The Guru Gita (lit. 'Song of the Guru') is a Hindu scripture that is said to have been authored by the sage Vyasa. The verses of this scripture may also be chanted. The text is part of the larger Skanda Purana. There are several versions of the Guru Gita, varying from around 100 to over 400 verses. Another view is that Guru Gita is part of Viswasara Tantra.

In the Siddha Yoga tradition, the Guru Gita is considered to be an "indispensable text"; few other traditions also share that view. Muktananda chose 182 verses to create a unique version of the Guru Gita, which has its own melody for chanting.

The text of the Guru Gita describes a conversation between the Hindu god Shiva and his wife, the goddess Parvati, in which she asks him how to achieve liberation. Shiva answers her by describing the guru principle, the proper ways of worshiping the guru and the methods and benefits of repeating the Guru Gita.

== Etymology ==
Guru Gita means "song of the spiritual teacher." According to Panini's Dhatu Patha, gu means concealment and ru means its removal. The Guru Gita similarly describes the meaning of guru. The word indicates the removal of the darkness of ignorance from the heart.

== In popular culture ==
The text was part of the 2010 film Eat, Pray, Love starring Julia Roberts.

The Guru Gita has also been popularized by Siddha Yoga practitioners, especially in the 1970s and 1980s, through the teachings of Swami Muktananda and Gurumayi Chidvilasananda. Daily or weekly recitations of the Guru Gita became a common ritual in Siddha Yoga ashrams globally, with the 182-verse version being the most commonly used.

== Bibliography ==
- The Nectar of chanting: Sacred texts and mantras sung in the ashrams of Swami Muktananda: Sanskrit transliteration with English translations SYDA Foundation Rev. ed edition (1978) ISBN 978-0-914602-16-3
- Paramhansa Pranavadarshan, Shri Guru Gita, Pranava, Inc. (2001) ISBN 978-0-9707791-0-6
- Shivom Tirth (2005). Shri Guru Gita: The Divine Song of the Guru, Meaning and Commentary. Swami Shivom Tirth Ashram, Inc. ISBN 978-0-9676306-5-6.
- Swami Narayananand (1972). Sri Guru Gita. Divine Life Society. ISBN 978-81-7052-092-4.
- Mark Griffin (2008). Shri Guru Gita: 108 Sutras for Awakening. Hard Light Pub. ISBN 978-0-9759020-6-6.
