= Ganeshpuri =

Ganeshpuri may mean:

- A village named Ganeshpuri in Maharashtra, India
- Vajreshwari Temple in the village
- The Siddha Yoga ashram by the village
