= Bharta Khurd =

- Village
- Location in Punjab, India Bharta Khurd (India)
- Coordinates: 31.0558658°N 76.0756874°E
- Country: India
- State: Punjab
- District: Shaheed Bhagat Singh Nagar

Government
  - Type: Panchayat raj
  - Body: Gram panchayat
- Elevation: 254 m (833 ft)

Population (2011)
  - Total: 1,650
- Sex ratio 827/823 ♂/♀

Languages
  - Official: Punjabi
- Time zone: UTC+5:30 (IST)
- PIN: 144518
- Telephone code: 01823
- ISO 3166 code: IN-PB
- Post office: Garcha
- Website: nawanshahr.nic.in

Bharta Khurd is a village in Shaheed Bhagat Singh Nagar district of Punjab State, India. It is located 5.3 kilometres (3.3 mi) away from postal head office Garcha, 5.4 kilometres (3.4 mi) from Rahon, 9.8 kilometres (6.1 mi) from district headquarter Shaheed Bhagat Singh Nagar and 94 kilometres (58 mi) from state capital Chandigarh. The village is administrated by Sarpanch an elected representative of the village.

== Demography ==
As of 2011, Bharta Khurd has a total number of 338 houses and population of 1650 of which 827 include are males while 823 are females according to the report published by Census India in 2011. The literacy rate of Bharta Khurd is 76.01%, higher than the state average of 75.84%. The population of children under the age of 6 years is 170 which is 10.30% of total population of Bharta Khurd, and child sex ratio is approximately 1024 as compared to Punjab state average of 846.

Most of the people are from Schedule Caste which constitutes 28.73% of total population in Bharta Khurd. The town does not have any Schedule Tribe population so far.

As per the report published by Census India in 2011, 665 people were engaged in work activities out of the total population of Bharta Khurd which includes 470 males and 195 females. According to census survey report 2011, 61.20% workers describe their work as main work and 38.80% workers are involved in Marginal activity providing livelihood for less than 6 months.

== Education ==
The village has Punjabi medium, co-ed primary and high schools. The schools provide mid-day meal as per Indian Midday Meal Scheme. The school provide free education to children between the ages of 6 and 14 as per Right of Children to Free and Compulsory Education Act. The village also has a charitable English medium, co-ed primary school which was founded in 1998.

KC Engineering College and Doaba Khalsa Trust Group Of Institutions are the nearest colleges. Industrial Training Institute for women (ITI Nawanshahr) is 14 kilometres (8.7 mi) away and Lovely Professional University 51 kilometres (32 mi) away from the village.

List of schools near Bharta Khurd:

- GSSS Bharta Kalan, Bharta Kalan
- Guru Nanak Public School, Sakohpur
- Shiv Chand Public School, Sakohpur
- Adarsh Bal Vidhalya, Aur
- Kirpal Sagar Academy, Daryapur

== Transport ==
Nawanshahr railway station is the nearest train station however, Garhshankar Junction railway station is 24 kilometres (15 mi) away from the village. Sahnewal Airport is the nearest domestic airport which located 52 kilometres (32 mi) away in Ludhiana and the nearest international airport is located in Chandigarh also Sri Guru Ram Dass Jee International Airport is the second nearest airport which is 158 kilometres (98 mi) away in Amritsar.

== See also ==
- List of villages in India
