= Gurumayi Chidvilasananda =

Guru (or spiritual head) of the Siddha Yoga path

- Born: Malti Shetty; 24 June 1955 (age 71); Mangalore, India
- Occupations: Guru, head of Siddha Yoga
- Notable work: Kindle My Heart (1989)
- Predecessor: Muktananda

Gurumayi Chidvilasananda (also known as Gurumayi or Swami Chidvilasananda), born Malti Shetty on 24 June 1955, is the guru or spiritual head of the Siddha Yoga path, with ashrams and meditation centers in both India (at Ganeshpuri) and the Western world (e.g. in Fallsburg, New York).

The global organization representing her and her teachings is the SYDA Foundation. According to the literature of Siddha Yoga, Gurumayi received spiritual initiation (shaktipat) from her guru, Swami Muktananda, when she was 14, at which time he designated her and her brother Swami Nityananda as his successors. She became a renunciate (sanyassin) in 1982. Muktananda died later that year and she and her brother jointly became the heads of Siddha Yoga. They proceeded to expand the Fallsburg ashram to accommodate large numbers of devotees. In 1985 Nityananda left the Siddha Yoga path.

She has authored several devotional books, starting with the 1989 Kindle My Heart.

== Life and career ==
=== Early life ===
Gurumayi Chidvilasananda was born near Mangalore, India on 24 June 1955. She was called Malti as a child and was the eldest of three children to a Mumbai couple who were devotees of Muktananda in the 1950s. Her parents took her to the Gurudev Siddha Peeth ashram at Ganeshpuri for the first time when she was five years old. During her childhood, her parents brought her, her sister and two brothers to the ashram on weekends.

She received spiritual initiation (shaktipat) from Muktananda at age fourteen and moved to the ashram as a formal disciple and yoga student. At age twenty, Swami Muktananda made her his official English language translator and she accompanied him on his second and third world tours.

=== Succession ===
On 3 May 1982, Gurumayi was initiated as a sannyasin into the Saraswati order of monks, taking vows of poverty, celibacy and obedience, and acquiring the monastic name of Swami Chidvilasananda, or bliss of the play of consciousness. She later became popularly known as Gurumayi, meaning absorbed or immersed in the guru. At this time Swami Muktananda formally designated her as one of his successors, along with her younger brother Subhash Shetty, whose monastic name was Swami Nityananda.

Swami Muktananda died in October 1982, after which Gurumayi and Nityananda became joint spiritual heads of the Siddha Yoga path. Nityananda left the Siddha Yoga path in 1985; according to his 1986 interview in Hinduism Today, he left by his own choice, deciding to cease to be a Siddha Yoga sannyasi but wishing his sister well as sole guru.

The personal quality of purity is emphasized in the Siddha Yoga tradition. Pechilis writes that Gurumayi's purity is highlighted to show that she continues the guru tradition, and that she is a suitably pure person to be the spiritual leader of the organization. Pechilis comments that while purity may have been an implicit credential for her predecessor gurus, one point of view is that it became "explicit and greatly emphasized during the succession dispute and is now a primary lens" for understanding Gurumayi's spiritual path. Unusually for female gurus, Pechilis writes, she was not apparently expected to marry at any time. Instead she took sannyasa in the way a male guru would.

The scholars Jeffrey Kripal and Sarah Caldwell write that the 1997 book Meditation Revolution, which includes five recognized scholars among its six authors, essentially legitimizes, systematizes, and canonizes Gurumayi Chidvilasanda's Siddha Yoga lineage. They state that this would be unexceptionable if presented as from devotees, but is problematic given their presentation of themselves as scholarly historians of religion.

=== Guru ===
In the 1980s and 1990s, Gurumayi Chidvilasananda gave lectures and conducted Siddha Yoga Shaktipat Intensives in India, United States, Europe, Australia, Hong Kong, Japan, and Mexico. Through Shaktipat Intensives, participants are said to receive Shaktipat initiation (the awakening of Kundalini energy that, according to Indian scriptural tradition, resides within each person) and to deepen their practice of Siddha Yoga meditation. From 1989 to 2019, the SYDA Foundation - the organization that "protects, preserves, and facilitates the dissemination of the Siddha Yoga teachings" - sponsored the Siddha Yoga Shaktipat Intensive given globally.

In 1992, Gurumayi's humanitarian initiative, the PRASAD Project, was incorporated in the United States. The project is an NGO in Special Consultative Status with the Economic and Social Council of the United Nations. It assists "people to achieve lives of self-reliance and dignity by offering programs of health, education and sustainable community development in India, dental care in the United States and eye care in Mexico." In the treatment of cataracts, PRASAD de Mexico has "performed free eye surgery on 26,087 adults and children."

In 1997, Gurumayi founded the Muktabodha Indological Research Institute with its own publishing imprint, Agama Press. The mission of Muktabodha, based on Gurumayi’s original intention for the organization in 1997, is "to preserve endangered texts from the religious and philosophical traditions of classical India and make them accessible for study and scholarship worldwide."

In 1998, The New York Times published an article about Siddha Yoga titled "This year, the jet set is seeking Nirvana." Celebrities including Meg Ryan, Melanie Griffith, Isabella Rossellini, Diana Ross, Lisa Kudrow, and Lulu publicly became devotees and frequented the South Fallsburg ashram. Large numbers of devotees also visited during weekends, for short stays, or for longer periods of service.

Between 1989 and 2006, Gurumayi wrote nine books of spiritual discourses, three books of poetry, three books of spiritual stories for children, and recordings in which she chants mantras. These were published by the SYDA Foundation, which holds copyright to all Muktananda and Childvilasananda works. The titles of her autobiographical books such as Ashes at My Guru's Feet and Growing up with Baba emphasize the importance of lineage in Siddha Yoga, placing her as the third of its spiritual masters. During this era, the SYDA Foundation, the business entity associated with Siddha Yoga developed "into a multimillion dollar entity" with business-type executives.

In 2020, in response to the global COVID-19 pandemic, Gurumayi started appearing in frequent live video satsangs streamed on the Siddha Yoga website.

== Reception ==
The scholar of religion Andrea Jain states that Gurumayi has adopted "a strategy of denial" that presents Muktananda as essentially perfect, in order to maintain the Siddha Yoga mission. She cites the scholar Douglas Renfrew Brooks's comment that she, like Muktananda, cites the Hindu tantric scripture Kularnava Tantra "frequently but selectively".

The scholar Karen Pechilis notes that female celibacy has caused conflict within the families of gurus such as Ammachi and Gauri Ma, but that it is not reported as an issue in biographies of Chidvilasananda. Another scholar of religion, Katherine Wessinger, comments that Chidvilasananda's position is "remarkable in that she combines the charisma of her ecstatic love for God (this is apparent when she chants the names of God) with the institutional authority of having been initiated as a sannyasin and of having been designated guru in a parampara (lineage of gurus) [her italics]".

The guru in Elizabeth Gilbert's 2006 memoir Eat, Pray, Love has been identified by multiple sources as Chidvilasananda. There are multiple close parallels: the guru is described as "feminine, multilingual, university-educated"; she resides in the United States; devotees recite the 90-minute-long Guru Gita every morning; she followed an Indian swami when a teenager; she worked as his translator before becoming a guru; she was in her 20s when she succeeded him.

In 1994, The New Yorker published an extensive profile of Gurumayi.

== Shaktipat experience ==
Sharing her shaktipat experience, Gurumayi wrote: "At one point during the pattābhisheka, the ceremony during which Baba Muktananda passed on to me the power of his lineage, he whispered So’ham [I am He] and Aham Brahmāsmi [I am of Brahman] in my ear. I experienced the mantra as an immensely powerful force that rocketed at lightning speed throughout my bloodstream and created an upheaval in my entire system. I instantly transcended body-consciousness and became aware that all distinctions such as inner and outer were false and artificial. Everything was the same; what was within me was also without. My mind became completely blank. There was only the pulsating awareness “I am That” accompanied by great bliss and light. When my mind again began to function, all I could think was, “What is Baba? Who is this being who looks so ordinary, yet has the capacity to transmit such an experience at will?” I knew beyond a doubt that the mantra was God. I had never experienced a force so mighty, yet at the same time so soothing."

== Publications ==
- Chidvilasananda, Gurumayi (1989). Kindle My Heart. Prentice Hall Press.
- ——— (1990). Ashes at My Guru's Feet. SYDA Foundation.
- ——— (1991). Siddha Yoga Diksha (in Hindi). SYDA Foundation.
- ——— (1994). My Lord Loves A Pure Heart. SYDA Foundation.
- ——— (1995). Inner Treasures. SYDA Foundation.
- ——— (1995). Blaze The Trail of Equipoise. SYDA Foundation.
- ——— & Muktananda, Swami (1995). Resonate With Stillness. SYDA Foundation.
- ——— (1996). The Yoga of Discipline. SYDA Foundation.
- ——— (1996). The Magic of the Heart. SYDA Foundation.
- ——— (1997). Enthusiasm. SYDA Foundation.
- ——— (April 1997). "Your True Companion: The Self Within". Hinduism Today.
- ——— (1998). Remembrance. SYDA Foundation.
- ——— (1999). Courage and Contentment. SYDA Foundation.
- ——— (2006). Sadhana of the Heart – Siddha Yoga Messages for the Year Volume 1: 1995–1999. SYDA Foundation.
