= Oakland Ashram =

Coordinates: 37.8412°N 122.2833°W

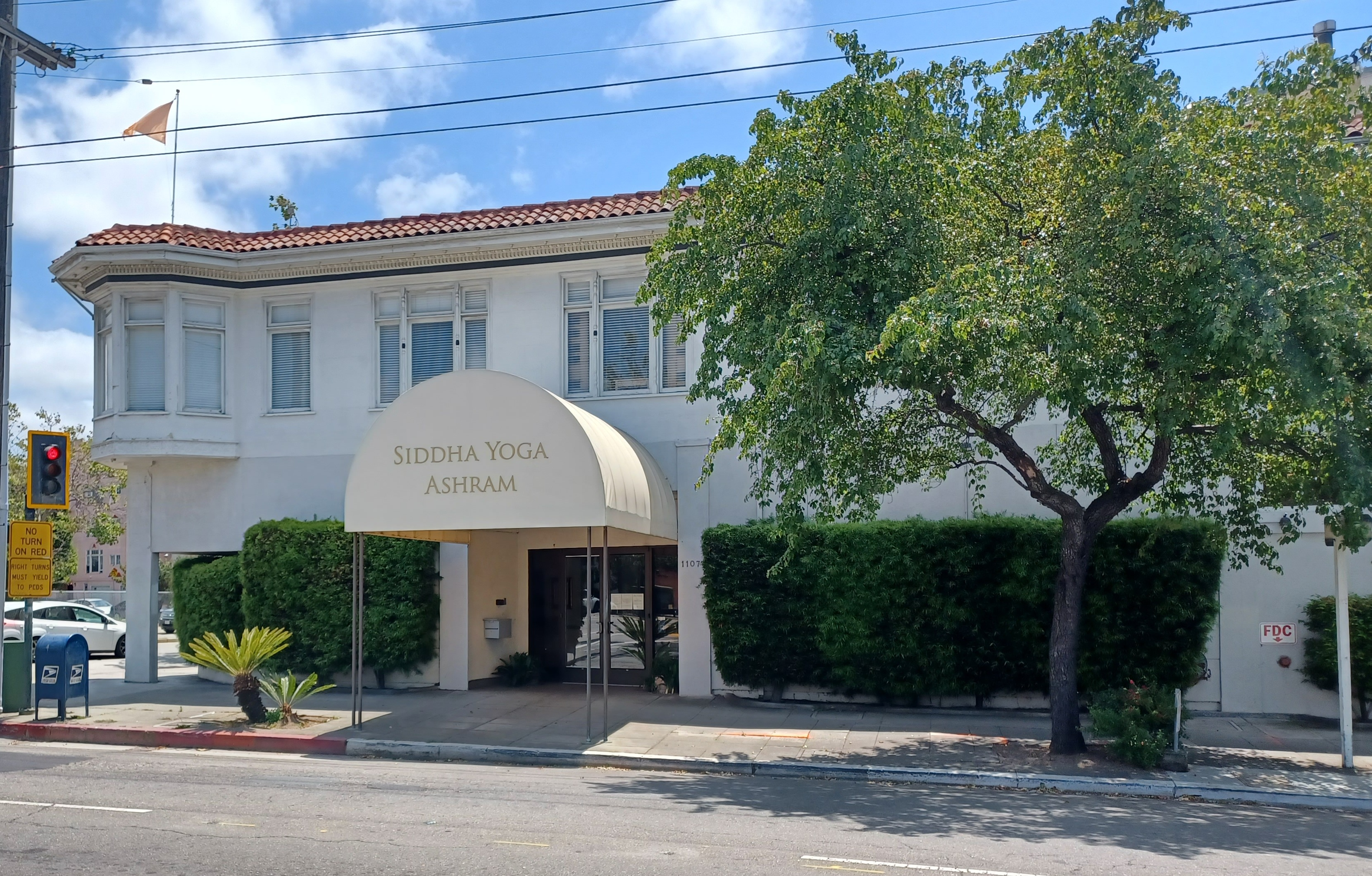

The Siddha Yoga Ashram in Oakland (or Oakland Ashram) is a Siddha Yoga retreat site in the Golden Gate neighborhood of Oakland, California, on the east side of San Francisco Bay. It was the second ashram established by the Indian meditation master Swami Muktananda, the first being Sri Gurudev Ashram, now Gurudev Siddha Peeth, in Ganeshpuri, India.

== History ==
When Swami Muktananda was on his second world tour in 1975, it became clear that he needed a permanent center in the United States where people could spend time with him and do the Siddha Yoga practices of chanting, meditation, and seva, or selfless service. His devotees acquired Hotel Stanford in a depressed part of Oakland and transformed it into an ashram.

The Oakland Ashram is where Swami Muktananda (also known as "Baba") first began teaching his devotees about the ancient philosophical teachings of Kashmir Shaivism. It is also where he developed Siddha Yoga Dham Associates and the other organizational aspects of Siddha Yoga.

The Siddha Yoga Ashram in Oakland is modelled after an ancient gurukula, or center of spiritual learning. The ashram offers a variety of events and retreats in which longtime practitioners as well as newcomers can explore the spiritual teachings and practices of Siddha Yoga.
