= Ganeshpur, Punjab =

Ganeshpur
- Village
- Location in Punjab, India
- Coordinates: 31.34293°N 76.01089°E
- Country: India
- State: Punjab
- District: Hoshiarpur
- Elevation: 296 m (971 ft)

Languages
  - Official: Punjabi
- Time zone: UTC+5:30 (IST)
- PIN: 146106
- Vehicle registration: PB-07
- Website: www.ganeshpur.com

Ganeshpur is a census village in Hoshiarpur District in the state of Punjab, India. Commonly two villages Ganeshpur & Bharta are collectively pronounced as Ganeshpur Bharta / Bharta / Bharta Ganeshpur.

== History ==
The Village Ganeshpur was Founded by Bains Jatts couple of centuries ago.

== Demographics ==
As of 2001 India census, village Ganeshpur had a population of 1500. Males constitute 55% of the population and females 45%. Ganeshpur has an average literacy rate of 61%,

More information about Ganeshour

- Village Name: Ganeshpur
- Tehsil: Garhshankar
- District: Hoshiarpur
- Post Office: Ganeshpur
- Pin Code: 146106
- Area in Hectares: 114
- Telephone Code: 01884
- Population (2001): 1500
- Main Road (Nearest): Phagwara-Mahilpur
- Railway Station (Nearest): Saila Khurd 13 km
- Development Bock: Mahilpur
- Website: www.ganeshpur.com
