= Gurudev Siddha Peeth =

Gurudev Siddha Peeth is an Indian ashram run by the Gurudev Siddha Peeth Trust and serving the Siddha Yoga path. It is situated between the villages of Ganeshpuri and Vajreshwari in the state of Maharashtra, 70 miles (110 km) north-east of Mumbai. On the Siddha Yoga path it is known as the "mother ashram" because it is where Siddha Yoga began.

== History ==
The ashram's origins date back to the guru known as Bhagawan Nityananda, who had been in the nearby village of Ganeshpuri since 1936. Before he died in 1961, Nityananda is said to have told his devotee, Swami Muktananda, to build an ashram near Ganeshpuri on land that Nityananda gave him. Nityananda prophesied that the ashram would become "very big and beautiful" and would attract people from all over the world.

Swami Muktananda established the ashram and called it Sri Gurudev Ashram, in honour of Nityananda. In 1978, Muktananda changed the name to Gurudev Siddha Peeth. The ashram has since grown as Nityananda predicted and is the site of shrines to both Nityananda and Muktananda (who died in 1982). It functions as a full-time spiritual retreat for people who want to pursue their Siddha Yoga practices. The ashram also runs short-term retreats, for example a seven-day "Pilgrimage to the Heart Retreat."

In addition to spiritual practice, the ashram established significant charitable services for the benefit of the adivasis (tribal people) of the area. Medical services and housing were provided for these people and for other poor people in the valley. The PRASAD (Note: Prasad means a religious offering in Hinduism.) Project was set up to administer these projects. The Project also organized several eye-camps in which those who were blind from cataracts received free corrective surgery that restored their eyesight. Current PRASAD projects include organic farmers' initiatives, irrigation and water conservation projects, women's self-help groups, and AIDS prevention awareness.

== In popular culture ==
Gurudev Siddha Peeth has been linked by multiple commentators with the ashram in Elizabeth Gilbert's 2006 memoir Eat, Pray, Love, since, among other clues, it has a multilingual female guru who was a swami's translator, succeeded him, and resides in the United States, attributes of Gurumayi Chidvilasananda, and where a 90-minute Guru Gita is sung every morning.

Hinduism Today magazine states that in the 1960s, the ashram was "an austere sanctuary" with few people. From 1970, Muktananda traveled widely, bringing thousands of visitors to the ashram. According to Catherine Parrish of SYDA Foundation, "People were coming to the ashram for the wrong reasons"; she explained that "tourists were showing up to eat at the ashram's non-existent 'five-star restaurant'." Crowding increased still further when Gurumayi was at the ashram. Accordingly, visitors were required to apply for at least a month's stay. The magazine reported that by 1995 there were once again fewer people: "everything is simpler; the silence is deeper."

== Sources cited ==
- Brooks, Douglas Renfrew; Sabharathnam (1997). Meditation Revolution. Agama Press. ISBN 81-208-1648-X.
