= Ganeshpur, Syangja =

Ganeshpur, Nepal गणेशपुर
- Village Development Committee
- Country: Nepal
- Zone: Gandaki Zone
- District: Syangja District

Population (1991)
  - Total: 3,265
- Time zone: UTC+5:45 (Nepal Time)

Ganeshpur, Nepal is a Village Development Committee in Syangja District in the Gandaki Zone of central Nepal. At the time of the 1991 Nepal census it had a population of 3265 people residing in 596 individual households.
