= Bharta, Hoshiarpur =

Bharta ਭਾਰਟਾ
- village
- Location in Punjab, India Bharta (India)
- Coordinates: 31.34407°N 76.01161°E
- Country: India
- State: Punjab
- District: Hoshiarpur
- Talukas: Garhshankar

Government
  - Type: Panchayati raj (India)
  - Body: Gram panchayat
- Elevation: 296 m (971 ft)

Population (2001)
  - Total: 2,000

Languages
  - Official: Punjabi
- Time zone: UTC+5:30 (IST)
- PIN: 146106
- Telephone code: 01884
- Vehicle registration: PB-07

Bharta is a census village in Hoshiarpur district in the state of Punjab, India.

== Demographics ==
As of 2001 India census, village Bharta had a population of 2000. Commonly two villages Ganeshpur & Bharta are collectively pronounced as Ganeshpur Bharta / Bharta / Bharta Ganeshpur.

== History ==
The village was founded by Bains Jatts couple of centuries ago.
