= Ganeshpur Bharta =

- Town
- Country: India
- State: Punjab

Languages
  - Official: Punjabi
- Time zone: UTC+5:30 (IST)

Ganeshpur Bharta is the combined name of two villages, Ganeshpur and Bharta, in the district Hoshiarpur of Punjab state of India. popular for its ancient Hindu temple, Mandir Baba Lakho Ji. The two villages have a common street that separates them, and the post office for both villages is situated in Ganeshpur.

== History ==
Both Villages were founded by Bains Jatts couple of centuries ago.
