= Shankarananda (Shiva Yoga) =

American Australian guru

Bhagawan Nityananda
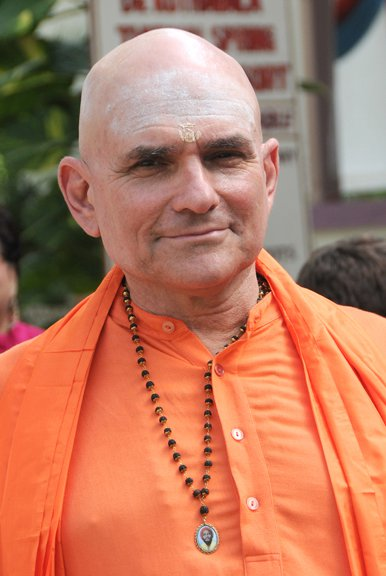
- Shankarananda in Ganeshpuri, 2016

Personal life
- Born: Russell Michael Kruckman; 1942 (age 83–84) Williamsburg, Brooklyn, New York City, U.S.
- Notable works: Happy for No Good Reason (2000); Consciousness Is Everything: The Yoga of Kashmir Shaivism (2003); Carrot in My Ear: Questions and Answers on Living with Awareness (2004); Self-Inquiry: Using Your Awareness to Unblock Your Life (2008); Ganeshpuri Days: Memoirs of a Western Yogi (2019)
- Honors: Mahamandaleshwar

Religious life
- Religion: Hinduism
- Philosophy: Kashmir Shaivism

Mahamandaleshwar Swami Shankarananda (born 1942) is an American-born yoga guru in the lineage of Bhagavan Nityananda of Ganeshpuri, and a teacher of meditation and Kashmir Shaivism. HHe is the founder of a residential ashram at Mount Eliza, on the Mornington Peninsula near Melbourne, Australia, where he has taught since the 1990s.

Swami Shankarananda is the author of several books on meditation and the philosophy and practice of Kashmir Shaivism. He emphasises spiritual practice (Sadhana), especially meditation, mantra, self-inquiry and teaches ancient teachings in Western terms.

In 2015 multiple allegations of sexual abuse were made against Shankarananda.

== Early life and education ==
Shankarananda was born Russell Michael Kruckman in Williamsburg, Brooklyn, New York City, the son of the cartoonist, illustrator and painter Herbert Kruckman and schoolteacher Selma Kruckman. He studied at Columbia University in New York, where he was a member of the university's intercollegiate chess team that won the Ivy League title in 1962.

== Career ==
=== Early career and spirituality ===
Shankarananda began his career as an academic at Indiana University. He turned to spirituality following a life-threatening incident. He met the American spiritual teacher Ram Dass, who prompted him to leave academic career in 1970 and travel to India in search of a teacher. There he practised Buddhist vipassana meditation with S. N. Goenka and hatha yoga with Baba Hari Dass, and met the Indian sages Neem Karoli Baba, Nisargadatta Maharaj and Anandamayi Ma before becoming a disciple of Swami Muktananda of Ganeshpuri, in the lineage of Bhagavan Nityananda. He remained a close disciple of Muktananda for around twelve years, and in 1977 was initiated into the Saraswati order of swamis by Mahamandaleshwar Swami Brahmananda at Muktananda's request. During this period, Shankarananda directed Siddha Yoga centres and ashrams in Ann Arbor, Los Angeles and New York City on Muktananda's behalf.

=== Teaching ===
After Muktananda's death in 1982, Shankarananda gradually became independent of the Siddha Yoga organisation. In 1986, he founded the Shiva Institute in Los Angeles, where he began teaching a method of meditation and inquiry drawing on Kashmir Shaivism, later called the Shiva Process. In 1991, he moved to Australia and together with his spiritual partner, Devi Ma Saraswati, established the Shiva School of Meditation and Yoga in Melbourne. In 1996, the group established its permanent residential ashram at Tower Road, Mount Eliza, on the Mornington Peninsula. At his ashram, he conducts weekly satsang programs every Saturday, where he discusses teachings from Muktananda, other spiritual figures, and his own experiences, often using humor.

In 2009, Shankarananda launched a website that cites all the gurus and teachers in Bhagavan Nityananda's lineage. He has participated in interfaith events. In 2003, he organized the "Power of Three" event, aiming to unite teachers from Muktananda's lineage to discuss various meditation practices. Participants included Master Charles and Swami Nityananda.

Shankarananda served as a patron of the Hindu Community Council of Victoria and took part in interfaith symposia in Melbourne during the 2000s.

=== Allegations of sexual misconduct ===
In 2015, allegations were made against Shankarananda that he engaged in sexual relationships with members of his ashram community. He admitted to the relationships and stated he had underestimated the impact of his tantric practices. Later, the organization was liquidated and Shankarananda resigned as director but continued as the spiritual leader, retaining ownership of the main property, now known as The Ashram Mount Eliza, where he continues to run regular programs for residents and the public. In 2021, further sexual abuse allegations were made against Shankarananda. These dated back at least 15 years and ranged from predatory, manipulative sexual practices to violent rape.

== Publications ==
- Happy for No Good Reason, Information Australia, Melbourne, 2000. ISBN 1-86350-314-5
- Consciousness Is Everything: The Yoga of Kashmir Shaivism, Shaktipat Press, Melbourne, 2003. ISBN 0-9750995-0-7
- Carrot in My Ear: Questions and Answers on Living with Awareness, Shaktipat Press, Melbourne, 2004. ISBN 0-9750995-2-3
- Self-Inquiry: Using Your Awareness to Unblock Your Life, Shaktipat Press, Melbourne, 2008. ISBN 978-0-9750995-3-7
- Ganeshpuri Days: Memoirs of a Western Yogi, Shaktipat Press, Melbourne, 2019. ISBN 978-164669081-7
