= Lis Harris =

American writer

- Born: February 12, 1940; New York City, U.S.
- Occupation: Literary Nonfiction Writer, Professor
- Education: Bennington College (BA)
- Genre: Nonfiction
- Spouse: Richard Harris (m. 1968; div. 1971) John Bowers (m. 1976, divorced) Martin Washburn (m. 2001)

Website
- lisharris.com

Lis Harris is an American author and critic and was for 25 years a staff writer on The New Yorker magazine which she left in 1995. Her work has appeared in The New York Times, The World Policy Journal, Du and the Wilson Quarterly. She is Chair of the Writing Program and a professor of writing at Columbia University

== Biography ==
Harris was born in New York City. She attended Bennington College, where she received her B.A. in 1961.

Harris joined the full-time faculty of the Writing Program at Columbia University's School of the Arts in 2003. There, she leads Nonfiction Dialogues, a series of conversations with distinguished writers. She is Chair of the Writing Program.

== Awards and honors ==
Harris was a Woodrow Wilson Lila Acheson Wallace Fellowship recipient twice. In 1998, she was awarded grants from the J.M. Kaplan Fund, the Fund for the City of New York, the Gund Foundation, the German Marshall Fund, the Kaplan Fund, the Fund for the City of New York, the Woodrow Wilson Lila Acheson Wallace Foundation, and the Rockefeller Fund.

== Publications ==
=== Books ===
- Holy Days : The World of the Hasidic Family, Touchstone books 1985 ISBN 0-684-81366-1
- Rules of Engagement – Four Couples and American Marriage, Touchstone books 1996 ISBN 0-684-82527-9
- ‘’Tilting at Mills: Green Dreams, Dirty Dealings, and the Corporate Squeeze’’, Houghton Mifflin 2003

ISBN 978-0-395-98417-8

- In Jerusalem: Three Generations of an Israeli Family and a Palestinian Family, Beacon Press 2019 ISBN 9780807029688

=== Selected articles ===
- 'Di and Li', profile of Diana Trilling, The New Yorker, Sept. 1993
- 'Annals of Intrigue', The Palio, The New Yorker, June 1989
- 'In the Shadow of the Golden Mountain", about Henry Roth, The New Yorker, June 1988
