= Shaktipata =

Transmission of spiritual energy

Shaktipata (Sanskrit: शक्तिपात, romanized: śaktipāta) or Shaktipat in Hinduism is the transmission (or conferring) of spiritual energy upon one person by another or directly from the deity. Shaktipata can be transmitted with a sacred word or mantra, or by a look, thought or touch – the last usually to the ajna chakra or agya chakra or third eye of the recipient.

Shaktipata is considered an act of grace (Anugraha) on the part of the guru or the divine. It cannot be imposed by force, nor can a receiver make it happen. The very consciousness of the god or guru is held to enter into the Self of the disciple, constituting an initiation into the school or the spiritual family (kula) of the guru. It is held that shaktipata can be transmitted in person or at a distance, through an object such as a flower or fruit.

== Etymology ==
The term shaktipata is derived from Sanskrit, from shakti "(psychic) energy" and pāta, "to fall".

== Levels of intensity ==
=== Levels ===
In Kashmir Shaivism, depending on its intensity, shaktipata can be classified as:

- tīvra-tīvra-śaktipāta - the so-called "Super Supreme Grace" - produces immediate identity with Shiva and liberation; such a being goes on to become a siddha master and bestows grace from his abode (Siddhaloka), directly into the heart of deserving aspirants
- tīvra-madhya-śaktipāta - "Supreme Medium Grace" - such a being becomes spiritually illuminated and liberated on his own, relying directly on Shiva, not needing initiation or instruction from other exterior guru. This is facilitated by an intense awakening of his spiritual intuition (pratibhā) which immediately eliminates ignorance
- tīvra-manda-śaktipāta - "Supreme Inferior Grace" - the person who received this grace strongly desires to find an appropriate guru, but he does not need instruction, but a simple touch, a look or simply being in the presence of his master is enough to trigger in him to the state of illumination
- madhya-tīvra-śaktipāta - "Medium Supreme Grace" - a disciple who receives this grace desires to have the instruction and initiation of a perfect guru; in time he becomes enlightened. However, he is not totally absorbed into this state during his lifetime and receives a permanent state of fusion with Shiva after the end of his life
- madhya-madhya-śaktipāta - "Medium Middle Grace" - such a disciple will receive initiation from his guru and have an intense desire to attain liberation, but at the same time he still has desire for various enjoyments and pleasure; after the end of his life, he continues to a paradise where he fulfills all his desires and after that he receives again initiation from his master and realizes permanent union with Shiva
- madhya-manda-śaktipāta - "Medium Inferior Grace" - is similar to "Medium Middle Grace" except that in this case the aspirant desires worldly pleasures more than union with Shiva; he needs to be reincarnated again as a spiritual seeker to attain liberation
- manda - "Inferior Grace" - for those who receive this level of grace, the aspiration to be united with Shiva is present only in times of distress and suffering; the grace of Shiva needs to work in them for many lifetimes before spiritual liberation occurs

=== Table ===
| Type of spiritual grace | When is the moment of liberation? | What one needs in order to attain liberation? | What is the defining quality of the recipient? |
|---|---|---|---|
| tīvra-tīvra-śaktipāta Super Supreme Grace | immediate | nothing exterior, only the grace of Shiva | capability to abandon duality |
| tīvra-madhya-śaktipāta Supreme Medium Grace | immediate | nothing exterior, only the grace of Shiva | intuition of nonduality (Note: Abhinavagupta distinguishes here between two sublevels: those whose intuition (pratibhā) is firm; those whose intuition is hesitant, who need more practice in order to stabilize; they would take a guru, study the scriptures or practice yoga) |
| tīvra-manda-śaktipāta Supreme Inferior Grace | after meeting a perfect guru | the presence of a physical guru | total surrender to his guru |
| madhya-tīvra-śaktipāta Medium Supreme Grace | at the end of life in this physical plane | the initiation and instruction of a guru | intense spiritual aspiration |
| madhya-madhya-śaktipāta Medium Middle Grace | after living for some time in a paradise | the initiation and instruction of a guru | spiritual aspiration is more intense than worldly desires |
| madhya-manda-śaktipāta Medium Inferior Grace | in the next physical incarnation | the initiation and instruction of a guru | lower aspiration than worldly desires |
| manda Inferior Grace | after many lifetimes of incremental progress | the initiation and instruction of a guru and lot of time | |

== Descriptions ==
=== Medieval ===
The philosopher and mystic Abhinavagupta (c. 950–1016) described shaktipata in the Kashmir Shaivism tradition.

=== Modern era ===
Swami Muktananda, in his book Play of Consciousness, describes in great detail his experience of receiving shaktipata initiation from his guru Bhagawan Nityananda and his spiritual development that unfolded after this event.

Paul Zweig has written of his experience of receiving shaktipata from Muktananda. In the same book Itzhak Bentov describes his laboratory measurements of kundalini-awakening through shaktipata, a study held in high regard by the late Satyananda Saraswati, founder of the Bihar School of Yoga, and by Hiroshi Motoyama, author of Theories of the Chakras.

Barbara Brennan describes shaktipata as the projection of the guru's "aura" on the disciple who thereby acquires the same mental state, hence the importance of the high spiritual level of the guru. The physiological phenomena of rising kundalini then naturally manifest.

In his book, Building a Noble World, Shiv R. Jhawar describes his shaktipata experience at Muktananda's public program at Lake Point Tower in Chicago on September 16, 1974 as follows:

"Baba [Swami Muktananda] had just begun delivering his discourse with his opening statement: 'Today's subject is meditation. The crux of the question is: What do we meditate upon?' Continuing his talk, Baba said: 'Kundalini starts dancing when one repeats Om Namah Shivaya.' Hearing this, I mentally repeated the mantra, I noticed that my breathing was getting heavier. Suddenly, I felt a great impact of a rising force within me. The intensity of this rising kundalini force was so tremendous that my body lifted up a little and fell flat into the aisle; my eyeglasses flew off. As I lay there with my eyes closed, I could see a continuous fountain of dazzling white lights erupting within me. In brilliance, these lights were brighter than the sun but possessed no heat at all. I was experiencing the thought-free state of "I am," realizing that "I" have always been, and will continue to be, eternal. I was fully conscious and completely aware while I was experiencing the pure "I am," a state of supreme bliss. Outwardly, at that precise moment, Baba shouted delightedly from his platform, "Mene kuch nahi kiya; kisiko shakti ne pakda" ("I didn't do anything. The Energy has caught someone"). Baba noticed that the dramatic awakening of kundalini in me frightened some people in the audience. Therefore, he said, 'Do not be frightened. Sometimes kundalini gets awakened in this way, depending upon a person's type.

== Related concepts ==
In Sahaj Marg, yogic transmission is named Pranahuti (Devanagari: प्राणाहूति, IAST: prāṇāhūti) from prāṇā, "life force" and āhūti, "offering". It is described as "the gracious and conscious offering of the life force or spirit by the Guru into the disciple’s heart."

== See also ==
- Ramana Maharshi
- Dhyanyogi Madhusudandas
- Diksha
