= Bharta Kalan =

- Village
- Location in Punjab, India Bharta Kalan (India)
- Coordinates: 31.0439811°N 76.0677802°E
- Country: India
- State: Punjab
- District: Shaheed Bhagat Singh Nagar

Government
  - Type: Panchayat raj
  - Body: Gram panchayat
- Elevation: 254 m (833 ft)

Population (2011)
  - Total: 1,747
- Sex ratio 882/865 ♂/♀

Languages
  - Official: Punjabi
- Time zone: UTC+5:30 (IST)
- PIN: 144518
- Telephone code: 01823
- ISO 3166 code: IN-PB
- Post office: Garcha
- Website: nawanshahr.nic.in

Bharta Kalan is a village in Shaheed Bhagat Singh Nagar district of Punjab State, India. Kalan is a Persian word for big and Khurd is a Persian word for small, when two villages have the same name they are distinguished by using Kalan or Khurd with the village name. It is located 5.9 kilometres (3.7 mi) away from Garcha, 20 kilometres (12 mi) from Banga, 17.7 kilometres (11.0 mi) from district headquarter Shaheed Bhagat Singh Nagar and 94.6 kilometres (58.8 mi) from state capital Chandigarh. The village is administrated by Sarpanch an elected representative of the village.

== Demography ==
As of 2011, Bharta Kalan has a total number of 355 houses and population of 1747 of which 882 include are males while 865 are females according to the report published by Census India in 2011. The literacy rate of Bharta Kalan is 78.68%, higher than the state average of 75.84%. The population of children under the age of 6 years is 171 which is 9.81% of total population of Bharta Kalan, and child sex ratio is approximately 988 as compared to Punjab state average of 846.

Most of the people are from Schedule Caste which constitutes 19.86% of total population in Bharta Kalan. The town does not have any Schedule Tribe population so far.

As per the report published by Census India in 2011, 547 people were engaged in work activities out of the total population of Bharta Kalan which includes 495 males and 52 females. According to census survey report 2011, 72.94% workers describe their work as main work and 27.06% workers are involved in Marginal activity providing livelihood for less than 6 months.

== Education ==
The village has a Punjabi medium, co-ed upper primary with secondary/higher secondary school founded in 1955. The schools provide mid-day meal as per Indian Midday Meal Scheme. The school provide free education to children between the ages of 6 and 14 as per Right of Children to Free and Compulsory Education Act. KC Engineering College and Doaba Khalsa Trust Group Of Institutions are the nearest colleges. Industrial Training Institute for women (ITI Nawanshahr) is 14 kilometres (8.7 mi) away and Lovely Professional University 51 kilometres (32 mi) away from the village.

== Landmarks and history ==
Gurudwara Sheed Singh, Gurudwara Singh Sabha, Shiv Mandir and Roja Baba Peer Ji are religious sites. The village also has a community hall and a playground.

== Transport ==
Nawanshahr railway station is the nearest train station however, Garhshankar Junction railway station is 25 kilometres (16 mi) away from the village. Sahnewal Airport is the nearest domestic airport which located 52 kilometres (32 mi) away in Ludhiana and the nearest international airport is located in Chandigarh also Sri Guru Ram Dass Jee International Airport is the second nearest airport which is 159 kilometres (99 mi) away in Amritsar.

== See also ==
- List of villages in India
