= Paul Zweig =

American critic, memoirist, poet

- Born: July 14, 1935; Brooklyn, New York
- Died: August 29, 1984 (aged 49); Paris, France
- Education: Columbia University (BA, MA); University of Paris (PhD)
- Occupations: Critic, poet, professor
- Employer: Queens College, City University of New York

Paul Zweig (July 14, 1935 – August 29, 1984) was an American poet, memoirist, and critic known for his study on Walt Whitman.

== Biography ==
Zweig was born in Brooklyn on July 14, 1935, and was raised in a middle-class Jewish family in Brighton Beach. He graduated from Abraham Lincoln High School, entered Columbia University to study engineering but switched to literature after taking classes taught by Mark Van Doren. He received his B.A. from Columbia in 1956 and M.A. in 1958. He lived in France and studied at the University of Paris, earning his PhD in comparative literature before returning to the United States in 1966.

Zweig taught at Columbia and Queens College and served as chair of its department of comparative literature in alternate years. He also reviewed works of poetry, criticism, and fiction for The New York Review of Books.

Zweig received a Guggenheim Fellowship in 1976 and was nominated for a National Book Critics Circle Award for Biography in 1984 for his study on Walt Whitman. He was posthumously named a Finalist for the Pulitzer Prize for Poetry in 1990.

In 1984, Zweig died of lymphatic cancer at age 49 in the American Hospital of Paris.
