= Muktananda =

Indian yoga guru (1908–1982)

Swami Muktananda

Personal life
- Born: Krishna Rai; 16 May 1908 Mangalore, Madras Presidency, British India
- Died: 2 October 1982 (aged 74) Ganeshpuri, Maharashtra, India
- Resting place: Muktananda's samādhi shrine, Gurudev Siddha Peeth
- Notable work: Play of Consciousness
- Website: siddhayoga.org

Religious life
- Religion: Hinduism
- Philosophy: Vedanta, Kashmir Shaivism
- Initiation: Shaktipat; 15 August 1947; Ganeshpuri, Mahrashtra, India by Bhagavan Nityananda

Religious career
- Post: Founder and guru of Siddha Yoga
- Period in office: 1956-1982

Muktananda (16 May 1908 – 2 October 1982), born Krishna Rai, was a yoga guru and the founder of Siddha Yoga. He was a disciple of Bhagavan Nityananda. He wrote books on the subjects of Kundalini Shakti, Vedanta, and Kashmir Shaivism, including a spiritual autobiography entitled The Play of Consciousness. In honorific style, he is often referred to as Swami Muktananda, or Baba Muktananda, or in a familiar way just Baba.

== Biography ==
Swami Muktananda was born in 1908 near Mangalore in Madras Presidency, British India, to a wealthy family. His birth name was Krishna Rai.

At 15, he encountered Bhagawan Nityananda, a wandering Avadhuta who profoundly changed his life. After this encounter, Krishna left home and began his search for the experience of God. He studied under Siddharudha Swami in Hubli, where he learned Sanskrit, Vedanta, and all branches of yoga. He received sannyasa initiation in the Sarasvati order of the Dashanami Sampradaya, taking the name of Swami Muktananda. After Siddharudha's death, Muktananda left to study with a disciple of Siddharudha called Muppinarya Swami at his Sri Airani Holematt in Ranebennur Haveri District. Then Swami Muktananda began wandering India on foot, studying with many different saints and gurus.

In 1947, Muktananda went to Ganeshpuri to receive the darshan of Bhagavan Nityananda, who had originally inspired Muktananda's search for God. He received shaktipat initiation from him on August 15 of that year. Muktananda often said that his spiritual journey did not truly begin until he received shaktipat from Nityananda. He described it as a profound and sublime experience. For the next nine years, Muktananda lived and meditated in a small hut in Yeola. He wrote about his sadhana and kundalini-related meditation experiences in his autobiography.

In 1956, Bhagawan Nityananda acknowledged the culmination of Muktananda's spiritual journey. He appointed Muktananda as the leader of an ashram in Ganeshpuri, near Bombay. The same year he started teaching his Siddha Yoga path. Between 1970 and 1981, Muktananda went on three world tours. During these tours, he established Siddha Yoga ashrams and meditation centers in many countries. In 1975, he founded the Siddha Yoga Ashram in Oakland in the San Francisco Bay area. In 1979, he established Shree Nityananda Ashram (now Shree Muktananda Ashram) in the Catskills, northwest of New York City. Muktananda established Gurudev Siddha Peeth as a public trust in India to administer his work there. He founded the SYDA Foundation in the United States to administer the global work of Siddha Yoga meditation. He wrote many books, sixteen of which are still in print with the SYDA Foundation.

In May 1982, Muktananda appointed two successors, Swami Chidvilasananda and her younger brother, Swami Nityananda, as joint leaders of Siddha Yoga. Nityananda later resigned and formed his own group.

Muktananda died in October 1982 in Gurudev Siddha Peeth in Ganeshpuri, India. He is buried in his samādhi shrine there.

== Teaching and practice ==
His central teachings were to "See God in each other", and "Honor your Self. Worship your Self. Meditate on your Self. God dwells within you as you." Muktananda often gave a shorter version of this teaching: "God dwells within you as you."

According to Lola Williamson, Muktananda was known as a "shaktipat guru because kundalini awakening occurred so readily in his presence". Through Shaktipat Intensives participants were said to receive shaktipat initiation, the awakening of Kundalini Shakti that is said to reside within a person, and to deepen their practice of Siddha Yoga meditation. Historically, Shaktipat initiation had been reserved for the few who had done many years of spiritual service and practices; Muktananda offered this initiation to newcomers and yogis alike. There are several published accounts that describe the reception of shaktipat from Muktananda. Paul Zweig wrote one such account of receiving shaktipat from Muktananda. In Gurus of Modern Yoga, Andrea Jain, in her chapter on Muktananda, quotes an anonymous source, who describes his moment of shaktipat, when he was 19 years old, conferred by Muktananda with a wand of peacock feathers in 1975:

I almost jumped when the peacock feathers, firmly but with a soft weightiness, hit me repeatedly on my head, and then gently brushed my face as [Muktananda] [...] powerfully pressed one of his fingers into my forehead at a spot located just between my eyebrows [...] I'm honestly somewhat reluctant to write about what happened next because I know that whatever I say will inevitably diminish it, will make it sound as if it were just another "powerful experience." This was not an experience. This was THE event of my spiritual life. This was full awakening. This wasn't "knowing" anything, because you only know something that is separate from you. This was being: the Ultimate - a fountain of Light, a dancing, ever-new source. Utter freedom, utter joy [...] Completely fulfilled, completely whole, no limits to my power and love and light."

== Alleged sexual assaults ==
Sarah Caldwell, in an essay in the academic journal Nova Religio (2001), argued that Muktananda was both an enlightened spiritual teacher and a practitioner of Shakta Tantrism, but also "engaged in actions that were not ethical, legal or liberatory with many disciples." According to Lola Williamson, "Muktananda stressed the value of celibacy for making progress on the spiritual path, but he almost certainly violated his own rules." Author Andrea Jain asserts "Muktananda engaged in secret sexual rituals with several of his young female disciples—some of whom were teenagers—that were meant to transmit sakti to the tantric hero."

In 1981, Stan Trout, a swami for Siddha Yoga, wrote an open letter in which he referred to a number of stories of Muktananda engaging in sexual activities with young women, and threats and harassment in order to force people to "stop talking about your escapades with young girls in your bedroom." In 1983 William Rodarmor printed several allegations in CoEvolution Quarterly from anonymous female devotees that Muktananda regularly had sex with them and raped them. In the article, based on twenty five interviews, former devotees charged that Muktananda had molested under-age girls, and engaged in sexual interactions with young devotees, which "drew naive young women into esoteric Tantric rituals." Lis Harris repeated and extended Rodarmor's allegations in an article in The New Yorker (1994).

== Bibliography ==
- Light on the Path (1972), Siddha Yoga Publications, ISBN 0-914602-54-3
- Mukteshwari: The Way of Muktananda (1972), SYDA Foundation
- Getting Rid of What You Haven't Got (1974), Wordpress ISBN 0-915104-00-8
- Ashram Dharma (1975), SYDA Foundation, ISBN 0-911307-38-9
- I Love You (1975), SYDA Foundation
- Selected Essays (1976), Siddha Yoga Publications, ISBN 0-911307-37-0
- God is With You (1978), Siddha Yoga Publications ISBN 0-914602-57-8
- I Am that: The Science of Hamsa from the Vijnana Bhairava (1978), Siddha Yoga Publications, ISBN 0-914602-27-6
- I Welcome You All With Love (1978), Siddha Yoga Publications, ISBN 0-911307-65-6
- In the Company of a Siddha: Interviews and Conversations With Swami Muktananda (1978), Siddha Yoga Publications ISBN 0-911307-53-2
- The Nectar of Chanting: Sacred Texts and Mantras Sung in the Ashrams of Swami Muktananda (1978), SYDA Foundation, ISBN 0-914602-16-0
- Play of Consciousness: A Spiritual Autobiography (1978), Siddha Yoga Publications, ISBN 0-911307-81-8
- Satsang with Baba : questions and answers between Swami Muktananda and his devotees (1978), Volumes 1 – 5, SYDA, ISBN 0-914602-40-3
- Kundalini: The Secret of Life (1979), Siddha Yoga Publications, ISBN 0-911307-34-6
- To Know the Knower (1979), Siddha Yoga Publications, ISBN 0-914602-91-8
- Meditate (1980), State University of New York Press, ISBN 0-87395-471-8
- Kundalini Stavah (1980), SYDA Foundation, ISBN 0-914602-55-1
- The Perfect Relationship: The Guru and the Disciple (1980), SYDA Foundation, ISBN 0-914602-53-5
- Reflections of the Self (1980), Siddha Yoga Publications, ISBN 0-914602-50-0
- Secret of the Siddhas (1980), Siddha Yoga Publications, ISBN 0-911307-31-1
- A Book for the Mind (1981), SYDA Foundation
- Does Death Really Exist? (1981), Siddha Yoga Publications, ISBN 0-911307-36-2
- Lalleshwari (1981), SYDA Foundation, ISBN 0-914602-66-7
- Where Are You Going?: A Guide to the Spiritual Journey (1981), Siddha Yoga Publications, ISBN 0-911307-60-5
- I Have Become Alive: Secrets of the Inner Journey (1985), Siddha Yoga Publications, ISBN 0-911307-26-5
- From the Finite to the Infinite (1990), Siddha Yoga Publications, ISBN 0-911307-31-1
- Mystery of the Mind (1992), SYDA Foundation
- The Self is Already Attained (1993), Siddha Yoga Meditation Publications, ISBN 0-914602-77-2
- Bhagawan Nityananda (1996), Siddha Yoga Publications, ISBN 0-911307-45-1
- Nothing Exists that Is Not Shiva: Commentaries on the Shiva Sutra, Vijnana Bhairava, Guru Gita, and Other Sacred Texts (1997) Siddha Yoga Publications, ISBN 0-911307-56-7

== Sources ==
- Caldwell, Sarah (2001), "The Heart of the Secret: A Personal and Scholarly Encounter with Shakta Tantrism in Siddha Yoga", Nova Religio, 5 (1): 9–51, doi:10.1525/nr.2001.5.1.9, JSTOR 10.1525/nr.2001.5.1.9, S2CID 143965805
- Harris, Lis (14 November 1994). "O Guru, Guru, Guru". The New Yorker. pp. 92–93.
- Jain, Andrea R. (2014), "Muktananda: Entrepreneurial Godman, Tantric hero", in Singleton, Mark; Goldberg, Ellen (eds.), Gurus of Modern Yoga, Oxford University Press
- Jain, Andrea R. (2015), Selling Yoga: From Counterculture to Pop Culture, Oxford University Press
- Jones, Constance; Ryan, James D. (2006), Encyclopedia of Hinduism, Infobase Publishing
- Rodarmor, William (1983). "The Secret Life of Swami Muktananda". CoEvolution Quarterly.
- Urban, Hugh B. (2012), The Cult of Ecstasy: Meldings of East and West in a New Age of Tantra, in the book Tantra: Sex, Secrecy, Politics, and Power in the Study of Religion, University of California Press, pp. 203–263, JSTOR 10.1525/j.ctt1pp4mm.12
- Williamson, Lola (2010), Transcendent in America: Hindu-Inspired Meditation Movements as New Religion, New York University Press
