= Daśanāmi Sampradaya =

Monastic tradition in Hinduism

The Daśanāmi Sampradaya (IAST: Daśanāmī Saṃpradāya "Tradition of Ten Names"), also known as the Order of Swamis, is a Hindu monastic tradition of "single-staff renunciation" (ēka daṇḍi saṃnyāsī). Ēkadandis were already known during what is sometimes referred to as "Golden Age of Hinduism" (ca. 320-650 CE). According to hagiographies composed in the 9th-17th century, the Daśanāmi Sampradaya was resurrected by Adi Shankaracharya, organising a section of the Ekadandi monks under an umbrella grouping of ten names and the four cardinal mathas of the Advaita Vedanta tradition. However, the association of the Dasanāmis with the Shankara maṭhas remained nominal.

== Ēkadaṇḍis ==
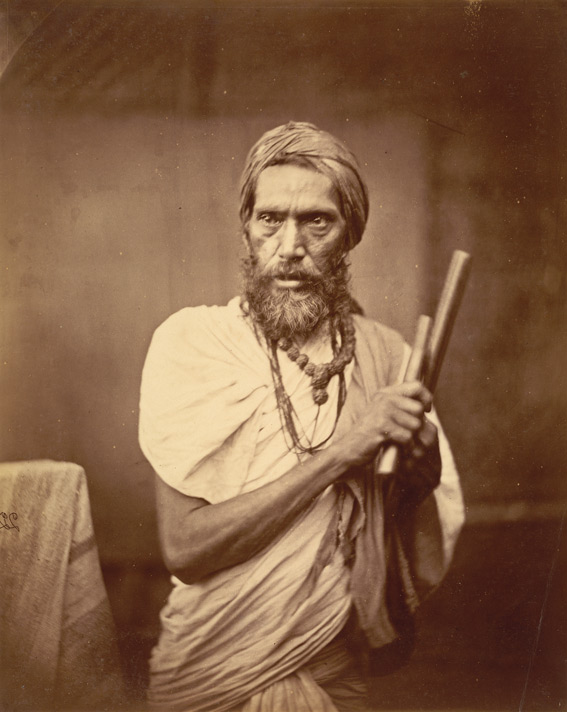
Dandi Sanyasi, a Hindu ascetic, in Eastern Bengal in the 1860s

Ēkadandis were already known during what is sometimes referred to as "Golden Age of Hinduism" (ca. 320-650 CE). The Ēkadaṇḍis existed in the Tamil speaking area during the southern-Indian Pandyan dynasty (3rd century BCE – 16th century CE) and the Southern-Indian Pallava dynasty (2nd – 9th centuries CE). Being wandering monastics, they were not settled in the brahmadeyas or settlement areas for Brahmins. There existed tax free bhiksha-bogams for feeding the Ēkadaṇḍi ascetics in the ancient Tamil speaking territory.

Ēkadaṇḍis and Tridandis were also active in Eastern India, and appear to have existed there during the Northern-Indian Gupta Empire (320 to 550 CE ).

According to R. Tirumalai, "There appears to have been no sectarian segregation of the Shaiva (Ēkadaṇḍi) and Srivaishnava (Tridandi Sannyāsins)".

Professor Kiyokazu Okita and Indologist B. N. K. Sharma says, Sannyasis in the lineage of Advaita of Adi Shankara and the Sannyasis in the lineage of Dvaita of Madhvacharya are all Ēkadaṇḍis.

== Establishment of the Dasanami Sampradaya ==
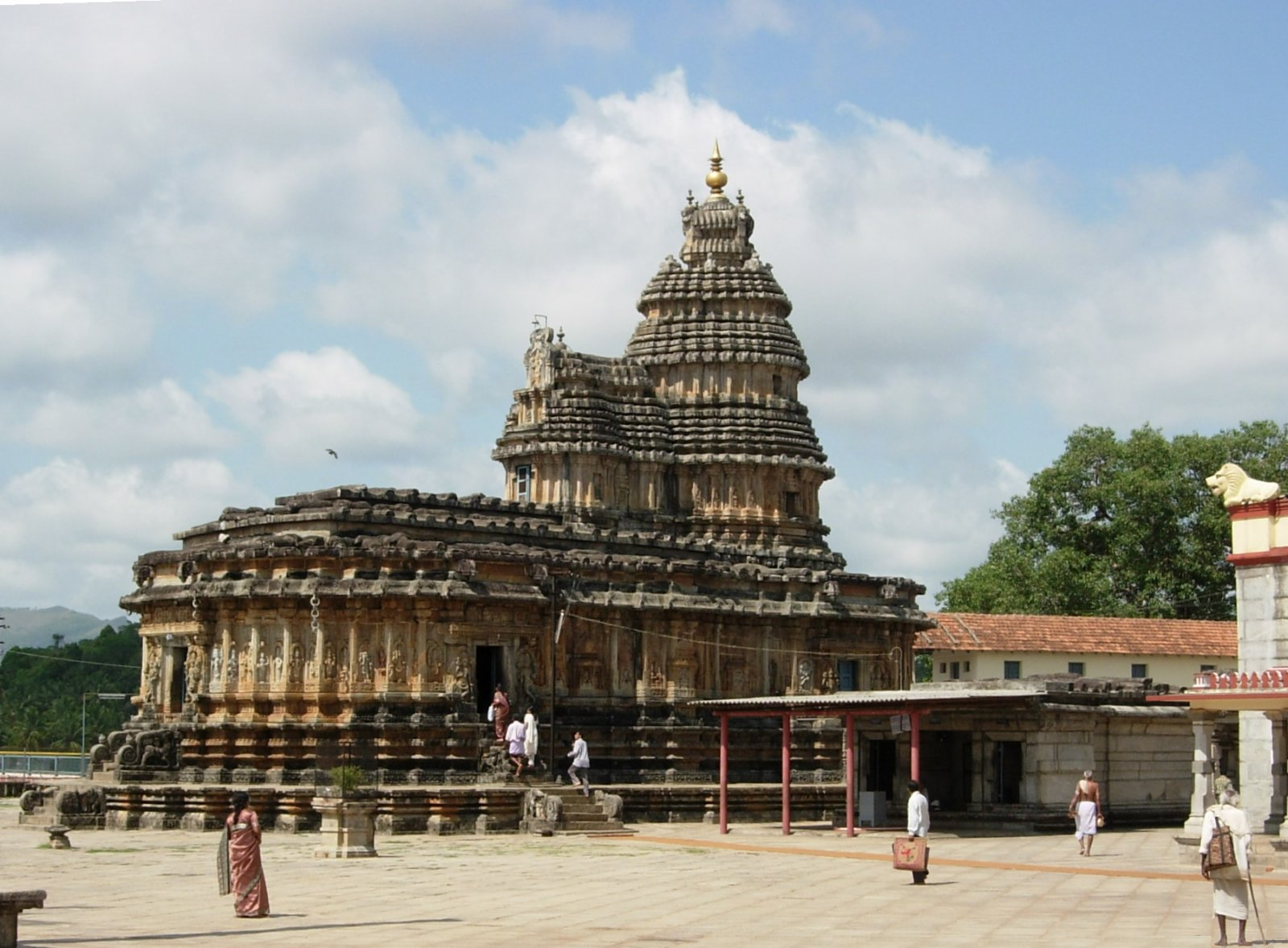
Vidyashankara Temple at Sringeri Sharada Peetham, Shringeri, Karnataka

According to tradition, Adi Shankara (9th cent. CE) established the Dasanami Sampradaya. Shankara came to be presented as an incarnation of Shiva in the 9th century, to facilitate the adoption of his teachings by previously Saiva-oriented mathas in the Vijayanagara Empire. From the 8th century onwards hagiographies were composed, in which he is portrayed as establishing the Daśanāmi Sampradaya, organising a section of the Ekadandi monks under an umbrella grouping of ten names. Several other Hindu monastic and Ekadandi traditions remained outside the organisation of the Dasanāmis.

According to these hagiographies, Adi Shankara organised the Hindu monastics of these ten sects or names under four maṭhas or monasteries, with headquarters at Dvārakā in the west, Jagannathadham Puri in the east, Sringeri in the south and Badrikashrama in the north. Each maṭha was headed by one of his four main disciples, who each continued the Vedanta Sampradaya.

Monastics of these ten orders differ in part in their beliefs and practices, and a section of them is not considered to be restricted to specific changes made by Shankara. While the Dasanāmis associated with the Shankara maṭhas follow the procedures enumerated by Adi Śankara, some of these orders remained partly or fully independent in their belief and practices; and outside the official control of the Shankara maṭhas.

The association of the Dasanāmis with the Smarta tradition or Advaita Vedānta is not all-embracing. One example is the Kriyā Yoga tradition that considers itself eclectic (see: Eclecticism), with ancient unchangeable beliefs, and outside the ambit of differences in the understanding of Vedanta. Other examples are the Tantric Avadhūta Sampradāyas and Ekadaṇḍi sannyāsa traditions outside the control of the Shankara maṭhas. The Dasanāmis or Ēkadaṇḍis also founded, and continue to found or affiliate themselves with, maṭhas, ashrams and temples outside the control of the Shankara maṭhas.

The Advaita Sampradāya is not a Shaiva sect, despite the historical links with Shaivism:

Advaitins are non-sectarian, and they advocate worship of Siva and Visnu equally with that of the other deities of Hinduism, like Sakti, Ganapati and others.

Nevertheless, contemporary Shankaracaryas have more influence among Saiva communities than among Vaisnava communities. The greatest influence of the gurus of the Advaita tradition has been among followers of the Smartha tradition, who integrate the domestic Vedic ritual with devotional aspects of Hinduism.

According to Nakamura, these maṭhas contributed to the influence of Shankara, which was "due to institutional factors". The maṭhas which he built exist until today, and preserve the teachings and influence of Shankara, "while the writings of other scholars before him came to be forgotten with the passage of time".

=== Four Amnaya mathas ===
According to tradition, Adi Shankara founded the four Amnaya Mathas to preserve the Vedic traditions, assigning each Matha a specific Veda and appointing his disciples to lead them.

Shishya (lineage)	Direction	Maṭha	Mahāvākya	Veda	Sampradaya
Padmapāda	East	Govardhana Pīṭhaṃ	Prajñānam brahma (Consciousness is Brahman)	Rig Veda	Bhogavala
Sureśvara	South	Sringeri Śārada Pīṭhaṃ	Aham brahmāsmi (I am Brahman)	Yajur Veda	Bhūrivala
Hastāmalakācārya	West	Dvāraka Pīṭhaṃ	Tattvamasi (That thou art)	Sama Veda	Kitavala
Toṭakācārya	North	Jyotirmaṭha Pīṭhaṃ	Ayamātmā brahma (This Atman is Brahman)	Atharva Veda	Nandavala

== Expansion of the Dasanāmi Sampradāya ==
According to the tradition in Kerala, after Shankara's samādhi at Vadakkunnathan Temple, his disciples founded four maṭhas in Thrissur, namely Naduvil Madhom, Thekke Madhom, Idayil Madhom and Vadakke Madhom.

According to Pandey, the ēkadaṇḍis or Dasanāmis had established monasteries in India and Nepal in the 13th and 14th century.

== Naga Sadhus akharas ==
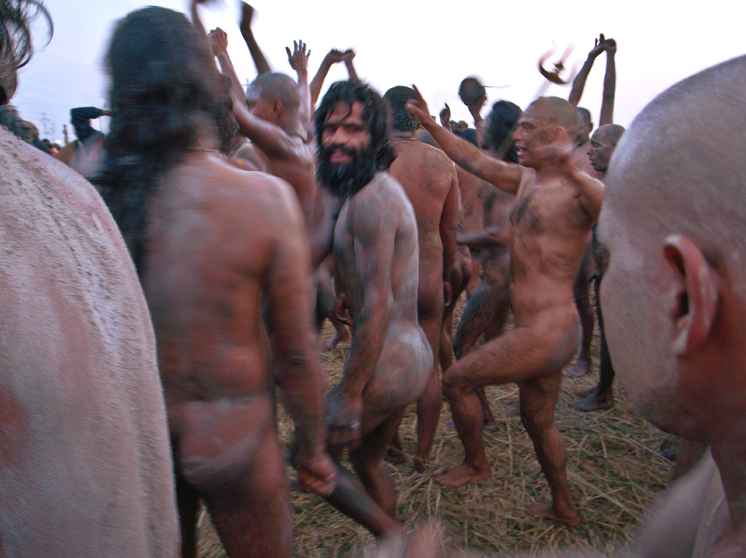
Naga Sadhu performing ritual bath at Sangam during Prayagraj Ardh Kumbhmela 2007.

In the 16th century, Madhusudana Saraswati of Bengal organised a section of the Naga (naked) tradition of armed sannyasis in order to protect Hindus from the tyranny of the Mughal invaders.

Warrior-ascetics could be found in Hinduism from at least the 1500s and as late as the 1700s, although tradition attributes their creation to Sankaracharya.

Some examples of Akhara currently are the Juna Akhara of the Dashanami Naga, Niranjani Akhara, Anand Akhara, Atal Akhara, Awahan Akhara, Agni Akhara and Nirmal Panchayati Akhara at Prayagraj. Each akhara is divided into sub-branches and traditions. An example is the Dattatreya Akhara (Ujjain) of the naked sadhus of Juna Naga establishment.

The naga sadhus generally remain in the ambit of non-violence, though some sections are also known to practice the sport of Indian wrestling. The Dasanāmi sannyāsins practice the Vedic and yogic Yama principles of ahimsā (non-violence), satya (truth), asteya (non-stealing), aparigraha (non-covetousness) and brahmacārya (celibacy / moderation).

The naga sadhus are prominent at Kumbh mela, where the order in which they enter the water is fixed by tradition. After the Juna akhara, the Niranjani and Mahanirvani Akhara proceed to their bath. Ramakrishna Math Sevashram are almost the last in the procession.

== Characteristics ==
=== Parampara ===
In the Indian religious and philosophical traditions, all knowledge is traced back to the gods and to the Rishis who primarily heard the Vedas by meditation.

The current Acaryas, the heads of the maṭhas, trace their authority back to the four main disciples of Shankara, and each of the heads of these four maṭhas takes the title of Shankaracharya ("the learned Shankara") after Adi Shankara.

The Advaita guru-paramparā (Lineage of Gurus in Non-dualism) begins with the mythological time of the Daiva-paramparā, followed by the vedic seers of the Ṛṣi-paramparā, and the Mānava-paramparā of historical times and personalities: (Note: The following Sanskrit Verse among Smarthas provides the list of the early teachers of the Vedanta in their order: "नारायणं पद्मभुवं वशिष्ठं शक्तिं च तत्पुत्रं पराशरं च व्यासं शुकं गौडपादं महान्तं गोविन्दयोगीन्द्रं अथास्य शिष्यम् श्री शंकराचार्यं अथास्य पद्मपादं च हस्तामलकं च शिष्यम् तं तोटकं वार्त्तिककारमन्यान् अस्मद् गुरून् सन्ततमानतोऽस्मि अद्वैत गुरु परंपरा स्तोत्रम्" "nārāyanam padmabhuvam vasishtam saktim ca tat-putram parāśaram ca vyāsam śukam gauḍapāda mahāntam govinda yogīndram athāsya śiṣyam śri śankarācāryam athāsya padmapādam ca hastāmalakam ca śiṣyam tam trotakam vārtikakāram-anyān asmad gurūn santatamānato’smi Advaita-Guru-Paramparā-Stotram", The above advaita guru paramparā verse salute the prominent gurus of advaita, starting from Nārāyaṇa through Adi Sankara and his disciples, up to the Acharyas of today.)

Daiva-paramparā
- Nārāyaṇa
- Sadāśiva
- Padmabhuva (Brahmā)
Ṛṣi-paramparā
- Vaśiṣṭha
- Śakti
- Parāśara
- Vyāsa (Note: the famous redactor of the vedas, he is also traditionally identified with Bādarāyaṇa, the composer of the Brahmasūtras)
- Śuka
Mānava-paramparā
- Gauḍapāda
- Govinda bhagavatpāda
- Śankara bhagavatpāda, and then Shankara's four disciples
  - Padmapāda
  - Hastāmalaka
  - Toṭaka
  - Vārtikakāra (Sureśvara) and others

=== Ten Names ===
Hindus who enter sannyāsa in the ēkadaṇḍi tradition take up one of the ten names associated with this Sampradaya: Giri, Puri, Bhāratī, Vana/Ban, Āraṇya, Sagara, Āśrama, Sarasvatī, Tīrtha, and Parvata. Sanyasis of Advaita Vedanta and Dvaita Vedanta belong to ēkadaṇḍi tradition.

One thing to be noted, the surname "Natha" is not given to dashnami sanyasis, this title is given to Natha Yogis who take sanyasa under the tradition of Natha Shaivism, which, is very close to the Siddhanta of Advaita Vedanta's monism.

=== Swami ===
A swami, as the monk is called, is a renunciate who seeks to achieve spiritual union with the swa (Self). In formally renouncing the world, he or she generally wears ochre, saffron or orange-colored robes as a symbol of non-attachment to worldly desires, and may choose to roam independently or join an ashram or other spiritual organisations, typically in an ideal of selfless service. Upon initiation, which can only be done by another existing Swami, the renunciate receives a new name (usually ending in ananda, meaning 'supreme bliss') and takes a title which formalises his connection with one of the ten subdivisions of the Swami Order. A swami's name has a dual significance, representing the attainment of supreme bliss through some divine quality or state (i.e. love, wisdom, service, yoga), and through a harmony with the infinite vastness of nature, expressed in one of the ten subdivision names: Giri (mountain), Puri (tract), Bhāratī (land), Vana (forest), Āraṇya (forest), Sagara (sea), Āśrama (spiritual exertion), Sarasvatī (wisdom of nature), Tīrtha (place of pilgrimage), and Parvata (mountain). A swami is not necessarily a yogi, although many swamis can and do practice yoga as a means of spiritual liberation; experienced swamis may also take disciples.

Single-staff renunciates are distinct in their practices from Shaiva trishuladhari or "trident-wielding renunciates" and Vaishnava traditions of Tridandi sannyāsis. (Note: The Tridandi sannyāsins wear the sacred thread after renunciation, while Ekadandi sannyāsins do not.) (Note: Ek means "one", ekadandi means "of single staff", tridandi means "of three staffs".)

== Standardised List of Dasanāmīs in Wikipedia ==
This section enumerates, in standardised manner, members of the Dasanāmī Order with articles in Wikipedia, listing each under his formal title and name, without the use of the honorifics (Note: e.g.: śrī and variations thereof, jī and variations thereof, swāmījī, mahātma, mahārsi, mahāyogī, mahāsaya, mahārāj, mahārājjī, paramahamsa, prabhu, prabhujī, mahāprabhu, gurudev, gurujī, guru mahārāj jī, sāheb, sāhebjī, bābā, bābājī, mā, māta, mātajī, bhagvan, prabhupāda, bhaktipāda.) used by devotees and disciples. The word "Swāmī" here is not an honorific. It is the title of an initiated member of the Dasanāmī Order. Entries are listed in standard form: TITLE (Swāmī) + PERSONAL NAME + SUB-ORDER NAME. A few entries have the additional title (not honorific) of "Jagadguru Śankarācārya" which designates either one of the four supreme leaders of the order (somewhat similar to the position of Pope in Catholic Christianity). "Mahanta" is an administrative title designating an organisational position or office assigned to certain persons.

=== A ===
Name	Notability
Swāmī Abhayānanda Puri	French American initiate of Vivekānanda.
Swāmī Abhedānanda Puri	Disciple of Ramakrishna.
Swāmī Abhinavavidyā Tīrtha	Jagadguru Śankarācārya of Śrngeri.
Swāmī Achalānanda Puri	Disciple of Vivekānanda.
Swāmī Achyutananda Sarasvatī	Gaudiya Vaisnava teacher.
Swāmī Adbhutānanda Puri	Disciple of Ramakrishna.
Swāmī Adidevānanda Puri	Ramakrishna monk.
Swāmī Advaitānanda Puri	Disciple of Ramakrishna.
Swāmī Agehānanda Bhāratī	Austrian American intellectual and expert on Indian languages and phonology.
Swāmī Agnivesha Sarasvatī	Social activist, well known for his protest against bonded labor.
Swāmī Akhandānanda Puri	Disciple of Ramakrishna.
Swāmī Akhilānanda Puri	Founder of Vedanta Society of Providence and Ramakrishna Vedanta Society of Boston.
Swāmī Akshobhya Tīrtha	Dvaitavādin.
Swāmī Ānanda Tīrtha	Preceptor of Dvaita.
Swāmī Ānandānanda Puri	Gandhian activist.
Swāmī Ashokānanda Puri	Ramakrishna monk.
Swāmī Atmabodhendra Sarasvatī	Pīthādhipati of Kamakoti Math, Kanchipuram.
Swāmī Ātmājñānānanda Puri	American Ramakrishna monk.
Swāmī Ātmasthānanda Puri	President of the Ramakrishna Mission.

=== B ===
Name	Notability
Swāmī Bhāratī Tīrtha	Jagadguru Śankarācārya of Śrngeri.
Swāmī Bhāratīkrsna Tīrtha	Jagadguru Śankarācārya of Puri and scholar of Indian mathematics. First Śankarācārya to visit the West. Authored Vedic Mathematics.
Swāmī Bhaskarānanda Sarasvatī	Scholar and anchorite of Benāres.
Swāmī Bhūmānanda Tīrtha	Social reformer. Teacher of Bhagavad Gita and Bhagavata Purana.
Swāmī Bhuteshānanda Puri	President of the Ramakrishna Mission.
Swāmī Bodhendra Sarasvatī	Pīthādhipati of Kamakoti Math, Kanchipuram.
Swāmī Brahmānanda Sarasvatī	Highly respected Jagadguru Śankarācārya of Jyotirmāyā Pītha, Badrināth.

=== C ===
Name	Notability
Swāmī Candrasekhara Bhāratī	Jagadguru Śankarācārya of Śrngeri.
Swāmī Chandrasekharendra Sarasvatī	Pīthādhipati of Kanchi Kamakoti Peetham, Kanchipuram. Featured in Paul Brunton's A Search in Secret India.
Swāmī Chidānanda Sarasvatī	Disciple of Swāmī Śivānanda Sarasvatī. President of Divine Life Society. Interfaith advocate and friend of Thích Nhất Hạnh.
Swāmī Chidānanda Sarasvatī	Founder of temples in Australia, Canada, Europe, and the USA.
Swāmī Chidvilasānanda Sarasvatī	Disciple and designated successor of Muktānanda. Sister of Nityānanda.
Swāmī Chinmāyānanda Sarasvatī	Hindu missionary. Disciple of Swāmī Śivānanda Sarasvatī and Swāmī Tapovanam Giri. Founder of Chinmaya Mission.

=== D ===
Name	Notability
Swāmī Dayānanda Sarasvatī	Socio-religious reformer. Founder of the Arya Samaj.
Swāmī Dayānanda Sarasvatī	Vedānt ācārya. Founder of Arsha Vidya Gurukulam. (Note: "Archived copy". Archived from the original on 7 September 2019.)
Swāmī Dhanarāja Giri	Advaita Vedānta ācārya. Founder of the highly-prestigious Kailash Ashram, Rishikesh.

=== G ===
Name	Notability
Swāmī Gahanānanda Puri	President of the Ramakrishna Mission.
Swāmī Gambhirānanda Puri	President of the Ramakrishna Mission.
Swāmī Ganapati Sarasvatī	Long-lived yogī of Benāres.
Swāmī Ganeshānanda Sarasvatī	Yoga teacher. Pupil and sannyās initiate of Swāmī Śivānanda Sarasvatī. Pupil of Swāmī Suraj Giri.
Swāmī Gangadharendra Sarasvatī	Teacher of Advaita Vedānta.
Swāmī Ghanānanda Puri	Ramakrishna monk who was active in Europe.
Swāmī Ghanānanda Sarasvatī	Ghanaian disciple of Swāmī Krishnānanda Sarasvatī. Possibly the first Black African convert to Hinduism.
Swāmī Gītānanda Giri	Indian Canadian physician. Yoga teacher; Mahanta of the Brighu Order; "Lion of Pondicherry".
Swāmī Gñānānanda Giri	Long-lived yogī. Guru of French Catholic monastic Abhishiktānanda.

=== H ===
Name	Notability
Swāmī Haridāsa Giri	Disciple of Swāmī Gñānānanda Giri.
Swāmī Hariharānanda Āranya	Noted Samkhya Yogī
Swāmī Hariharānanda Giri	Kriyā Yoga teacher. Pupil of Śrījukteśvara, Bhupendranāth Sanyal, Yogānanda, Satyānanda, and Bijoy Krishna.
Swāmī Hariharānanda Sarasvatī	Respected Vedānt ācārya. Disciple of Swāmī Brahmānanda Sarasvatī. Met Yogānanda at the Kumbh Mela.

=== I ===
Name	Notability
Swāmī Isvara Puri	Dvaitavādin.

=== J ===
Name	Notability
Swāmī Janakānanda Sarasvatī	Danish disciple of Swāmī Satyānanda Sarasvatī. Founder of Skandinavisk Yoga och Meditationsskola.
Swāmī Jaya Tīrtha	Dvaitavādin.
Swāmī Jaya Tīrtha	Dvaitavādin.
Swāmī Jayendra Sarasvatī	Disciple of Swāmī Chandrasekharendra Sarasvatī. Pīthādhipati of Kamakoti Math, Kanchipuram.
Swāmī Jītātmānanda Puri	Ramakrishna monk.

=== K ===
Name	Notability
Swāmī Kalyanānanda Puri	Disciple of Vivekānanda.
Swāmī Kesavānanda Bhāratī	Mahānta/Pīthādhipati of Edneer Math, Kasaragod district, Kerala.
Swāmī Kesavānanda Tīrtha	Yogī of Vrindāban.
Swāmī Kirtidānanda Puri	Ramakrishna monk.
Swāmī Krishnānanda Sarasvatī	Disciple of Śivānanda; General Secretary of Divine Life Society, 1963–2001.
Swāmī Kriyānanda Giri	American disciple of Yogānanda. Founder of Ananda World Brotherhood Colonies.
Swāmī Kṛṣṇacaitanya Bhāratī	Vaisnava scholar and teacher. Foremost historical figure of Bangla Vaisnavism. Regarded as an avatār and called "Caitanya Mahaprabhu" by devotees.

=== L ===
Name	Notability
Swāmī Laksmanānanda Sarasvatī	Humanitarian social relief worker of Orissa. Assassinated by Christians and Maoists.
Swāmī Laksmīnārāyana Tīrtha	Dvaitavādin.

=== M ===
Name	Notability
Swāmī Madhavānanda Puri	President of the Ramakrishna Mission.
Swāmī Madhavendra Puri	Dvaitavādin. Disciple of Lakshmipati Tirtha.
Swāmī Madhusūdana Sarasvatī	Teacher of Advaita Vedānta.
Swāmī Mahādevendra Sarasvatī	Pīthādhipati of Kamakoti Math, Kanchipuram.
Swāmī Maheshwarānanda Puri	Yoga in Daily Life and Om Ashram Founder, Shree Alakh Puriji Siddhapeetha Yogī.
Swāminī Māyātitānanda Sarasvatī	Ayurveda teacher.
Swāmī Muktānanda Sarasvatī	Meditation teacher. Founded the SYDA (Siddha Yoga Dham) organisation, with several ashrams and centers. Author.

=== N ===
Name	Notability
Swāmī Narahari Tīrtha	Dvaitavādin. Disciple of Swāmī Ānanda Tīrtha.
Swāmī Nārāyanānanda Puri	Ramakrishna monk. Rāja Yoga teacher in Denmark.
Swāmī Nigamānanda Sarasvatī	Bhakta, gyānī, yogī, tantrika of Eastern India.
Swāmī Nikhilānanda Puri	Ramakrishna monastic; Vedānta teacher in the USA.
Swāmī Nirañjanānanda Puri	One of the six disciples of Ramakrishna who were regarded as Iśvarakoti.
Swāmī Nirañjanānanda Sarasvatī	Disciple of Satyānanda; head of Bihar School of Yoga.
Swāmī Nirmalānanda Puri	Disciple of Ramakrishna.
Swāmī Nischalananda Sarasvatī	The present Jagadguru Shankaracharya of Govardhan Math, Puri.
Swāmī Nischayānanda Puri	Disciple of Vivekānanda.
Swāmī Nrsimha Sarasvatī	Sage of Mahārāshtra. Regarded as an incarnation of the legendary sage Dattātreya.

=== O ===
Name	Notability
Swāmī Omānanda Puri	Irish violinist, singer, Theosophist, writer, poet, esoteric teacher and authority on Indian music.
Swāmī Omānanda Sarasvatī	Educator.

=== P ===
Name	Notability
Swāmī Padmanabha Tīrtha	Dvaitavādin. Disciple of Swāmī Ānanda Tīrtha.
Swāmī Paramānanda Puri	Ramakrishna monk. Vedānta teacher in the USA.
Swāmī Prabhavānanda Puri	Ramakrishna monk. Vedānta teacher in the USA.
Swāmī Prakāshānanda Puri	Ramakrishna monk; Vedānta teacher in the USA.
Swāmī Prakāshānanda Sarasvatī	Rādhā-Krsna devotee, convict and fugitive in the USA. Disciple of Rādhā-Krsna Bhakta Kripālu "Mahārāj."
Swāmī Prakāshānanda Sarasvatī	Hindu teacher in Trinidad.
Swāmī Prameyānanda Puri	Ramakrishna monk.
Swami Pranavānanda Giri	Founder of Bharat Sevashram Sangha.
Swāmī Pranavānanda Sarasvatī	Disciple of Śivānanda; Yoga-Vedānta teacher, Divine Life Society, Malaysia.
Swāmī Premānanda Puri	One of the six disciples of Ramakrishna who were regarded as Iśvarakoti.
Swāmī Purana Puri	An 18th-century Indian ascetic monk and traveller who visited many places including Sri Lanka, Moscow, Yemen & Tibet.
Swāmī Purnaprajñā Tīrtha	Founder and Preceptor of Dvaitavāda.
Swāmī Purushottamānanda Puri	Ramakrishna monk.

=== R ===
Name	Notability
Swāmī Raghavendra Tīrtha	Dvaitavādin and Pīthādhipati.
Swāmī Raghaveshwara Bhāratī	Advaita Vedāntin. 36th Jagadguru of Sri Ramachandrapura Math, Hosanagara, Shimoga, Karnātaka.
Swāmī Raghuttama Tīrtha	Dvaitavādin. 14th Pīthādhipati of Uttaradi Math.
Swāmī Rāma Bhāratī	Yogī; founder of Himalayan International Institute of Yoga Science and Philosophy, Honesdale, Pennsylvania.
Swāmī Rāma Tīrtha	Teacher of "Practical Vedanta".
Swāmī Ramakrishna Puri	Temple priest, ascetic, mystic of Bengal. Regarded as an avatār (a "descent" or physical incarnation of God) by devotees.
Swāmī Rāmakrishnānanda Puri	Disciple of Ramakrishna.
Swāmī Rāmānanda Tīrtha	Activist in Hyderābād.
Swāmī Ranganāthānanda Puri	President of the Ramakrishna Mission and a great Vedantin.
Swāmī Rudrānanda Puri	Ramakrishna monk in Fiji.
Swāmī Rudrānanda Sarasvatī	American spiritual teacher.

=== S ===
Name	Notability
Swāmī Saccidānanda Bhāratī	Jagadguru Śankarācārya of Śrngeri.
Swāmī Saccidānandaśivābhinavanrsiṃha Bhāratī	Jagadguru Śankarācārya of Śrngeri.
Swāmī Sadānanda Puri	Disciple of Vivekānanda.
Swāmī Sadaśivendra Sarasvatī	Scholar, yogī-siddha, poet, avadhūta; mentioned in Yogānanda's Autobiography of a Yogi.
Swāmī Sahajānanda Sarasvatī	Indian nationalist.
Swāmī Sahajānanda Sarasvatī	South African spiritual teacher. Disciple of Śivānanda.
Swāmī Samarpanānanda Puri	Ramakrishna monk.
Swāmī Samyamindra Tīrtha	Dvaitavādin. 21st Mathadhipati of Kashi Math.
Swāmī Śaradānanda Puri	Disciple of Ramakrishna. Author of the Śrī Śrī Ramakrishna Līlaprasanga, the lead biography of Ramakrishna.
Swāmī Sarvapriyānanda Puri	Ramakrishna monk. Resident of Vedanta Society of New York.
Swāmī Satchidānanda Sarasvatī	Yoga teacher. Disciple of Śivānanda. Founder of Sivananda Ashram (Sri Lanka) and Satchidananda Ashrams (USA).
Swāmī Satcidānandendra Sarasvatī	Vedānt ācārya.
Swāmī Satyābhinava Tīrtha	Dvaitavādin. 21st Pīthādhipati of Uttaradi Math.
Swāmī Satyabodha Tīrtha	Dvaitavādin. 25th Pīthādhipati of Uttaradi Math.
Swāmī Satyadharma Tīrtha	Dvaitavādin.28th Pīthādhipati of Uttaradi Math.
Swāmī Satyadhyāna Tīrtha	Dvaitavādin. 38th Pīthādhipati of Uttaradi Math.
Swāmī Satyajñāna Tīrtha	Dvaitavādin. 37th Pīthādhipati of Uttaradi Math.
Swāmī Satyamitrānanda Giri	Founder of Bharat Mata Mandir, a temple in Haridwar.
Swāmī Satyānanda Giri	Kriyā Yoga teacher. Disciple of Śrījukteśvara.
Swāmī Satyānanda Sarasvatī	Disciple of Śivānanda; founder of Bihar School of Yoga.
Swāmī Satyanātha Tīrtha	Dvaitavādin. 20th Pīthādhipati of Uttaradi Math.
Swāmī Satyanidhi Tīrtha	Dvaitavādin. 19th Pīthādhipati of Uttaradi Math.
Swāmī Satyapramoda Tīrtha	Dvaitavādin. 41st Pīthādhipati of Uttaradi Math.
Swāmī Satyapriya Tīrtha	Dvaitavādin. 24th Pīthādhipati of Uttaradi Math.
Swāmī Satyātmā Tīrtha	Dvaitavādin. 42nd Pīthādhipati of Uttaradi Math.
Swāmī Satyavara Tīrtha	Dvaitavādin. 27th Pīthādhipati of Uttaradi Math.
Swāmī Satyavijaya Tīrtha	Dvaitavādin. 23rd Pīthādhipati of Uttaradi Math.
Swāmī Shambhavānanda Puri	Ramakrishna monk.
Swāmī Shankarānanda Puri	President of the Ramakrishna Mission.
Swāmī Shankarānanda Sarasvatī	American disciple of Muktānanda.
Swāmī Shantānanda Sarasvatī	Disciple of Śivānanda. Spiritual guide in Kuala Lumpur, Malaysia.
Swāmī Shivānanda Puri	Disciple of Ramakrishna and 2nd President of the Ramakrishna Order.
Swāmī Shivom Tīrtha	Siddhayoga teacher.
Swāmī Shraddhānanda Sarasvatī	Hindu social activist. Assassinated by a Muslim.
Swāmī Shuddhānanda Puri	President of the Ramakrishna Mission.
Swāmī Śivānanda Sarasvatī	Founded Divine Life Society and Yoga-Vedanta Forest Academy, Rishikesh; authored 200 books.
Swāmī Śivānanda Rādhā Sarasvatī	Canadian yoga teacher. Disciple of Śivānanda.
Swāmī Smaranānanda Puri	Ramakrishna monk. President of the Ramakrishna Order.
Swāmī Śrījukteśvara Giri	Kriyā Yoga adept. Astrologer. Disciple of Shyāmacharan Lahirī. Guru of Yogānanda.
Swāmī Subodhānanda Puri	Disciple of Ramakrishna.
Swāmī Sudhindra Tīrtha	Dvaitavādin. 20th Mathadhipati of Kashi Math.
Swāmī Sukhabodhānanda Sarasvatī	Teacher of scripture.
Swāmī Sukrathindra Tīrtha	Dvaitavādin. 19th Mathadhipati of Kashi Math.
Swāmī Swahānanda Puri	Ramakrishna monk.
Swāmī Swarūpānanda Puri	Disciple of Vivekānanda.
Swāmī Swarūpānanda Sarasvatī	Jagadguru Śankarācārya of Jyotirmāyā and Dwarka Pītha.
Swāmī Swarūpānandendra Sarasvatī	Founder of Visakha Sri Sarada Pitha.

=== T ===
Name	Notability
Swāmī Tapasyānanda Puri	Ramakrishna monk.
Swāmī Tapovanam Giri	Reclusive yogī of Uttar Kashi.
Swāmī Tathāgatānanda Puri	Ramakrishna monk.
Swami Tejomayananda Saraswati	Current Head of Chinmaya Mission Worldwide.
Swāmī Trigunatitānanda Puri	Disciple of Ramakrishna.
Swāmī Turiyānanda Puri	Disciple of Ramakrishna.
Swāmī Tyagānanda Puri	Ramakrishna monk. Hindu chaplain of Massachusetts Institute of Technology.

=== V ===
Name	Notability
Swāmī Vadirāja Tīrtha	Dvaitavādin. 20th Pīthādhipati of Sodhe Math.
Swāmī Vasudevānanda Sarasvatī	Wandering monk, spiritual teacher, author.
Swāmī Vedanidhi Tīrtha	Dvaitavādin. 17th Pīthādhipati of Uttaradi Math.
Swāmī Venkateśānanda Sarasvatī	Disciple of Śivānanda; founder of Sivananda Ashrams in South Africa and Mauritius.
Swāmī Vidyānāthānanda Puri	Ramakrishna monk and mathematician.
Swāmī Vidyāranya Tīrtha	Jagadguru Śankarācārya of Śrngeri.
Swāmī Vidyādhīśa Tīrtha	Dvaitavādin. 16th Pīthādhipati of Uttaradi Math.
Swāmī Vidyātmānanda Puri	Ramakrishna monk.
Swāmī Vijayendra Sarasvatī	Disciple and designated successor of Jayendra Sarasvatī.
Swāmī Vijayendra Tīrtha	Dvaitavādin.
Swāmī Vijñānānanda Puri	Disciple of Ramakrishna.
Swāmī Vimalānanda Puri	Disciple of Vivekānanda.
Swāmī Vipulānanda Puri	Srī Lankān Ramakrishna monastic and Hindu revivalist.
Swāmī Virajānanda Puri	President of the Ramakrishna Mission.
Swāmī Vireshwarānanda Puri	President of the Ramakrishna Mission.
Swāmī Vishnu Tīrtha	Siddhayoga teacher.
Swāmī Vishnudevānanda Sarasvatī	Yogī. Peace activist. Most famous disciple of Swāmī Śivānanda Sarasvatī (the two of them are the most well-known members of the Sarasvati sub-order). Founder of the worldwide Sivananda Yoga Vedanta Centres. Authored The Complete Illustrated Book of Yoga. Airplane pilot.
Swāmī Vishuddhānanda Puri	President of the Ramakrishna Mission.
Swāmī Vishwadevānanda Puri	Teacher of Advaita Vedānta.
Swāmī Vivekānanda Puri	Most famous of disciples of Ramakrishna (the two of them are the most well-known members of the Puri sub-order). Most famous figure at first Parliament of the World's Religions (Chicago, 1893). Organiser of the Ramakrishna Mission. One of the six disciples of Ramakrishna who were regarded as Iśvarakoti.
Swāmī Vyāsa Tīrtha	Dvaitavādin.
Swāmī Vyāsachalamahādevendra Sarasvatī	Pīthādhipati of Kamakoti Math, Kanchipuram.

=== Y ===
Name	Notability
Swāmī Yatīśwarānanda Puri	Ramakrishna monk. Spiritual teacher and meditation instructor.
Swāmī Yogānanda Giri	Disciple of Svāmī Śrīyukteśwara Giri. Founder of Self-Realization Fellowship. Author of Autobiography of a Yogi. Known by honorific "Paramahansa."
Swāmī Yogānanda Giri	Leading Hindu of Italy. Disciple of Gītānanda.
Swāmī Yogānanda Puri	One of the six disciples of Ramakrishna who were regarded as Iśvarakoti.

== Sources ==
Printed sources

- Clark, Matthew (2006), The Daśanāmī-saṃnyāsīs. The Integration Of Ascetic Lineages Into An Order, BRILL
- Sarkar, Jadunath (1955), A History of Daśanāmī Nāgā saṃnyāsīs, Routledge
- Farquhar, J.N. (1925), The Organization of the Sannyasis of the Vedanta, Journal of the Royal Asiatic Society
- Sharma, B. N. Krishnamurti (2000). A History of the Dvaita School of Vedānta and Its Literature, 3rd Edition. Motilal Banarsidass (2008 Reprint). ISBN 978-8120815759.
- McRae, John (2003), Seeing Through Zen. Encounter, Transformation, and Genealogy in Chinese Chan Buddhism, The University Press Group Ltd, ISBN 9780520237988
- Michaels, Axel (2004), Hinduism. Past and present, Princeton, New Jersey: Princeton University Press
- Nakamura, Hajime (2004), A History of Early Vedanta Philosophy. Part Two, Delhi: Motilal Banarsidass Publishers Private Limited
- Okita, Kiyokazu (2014). Hindu Theology in Early Modern South Asia: The Rise of Devotionalism and the Politics of Genealogy. Oxford University Press. ISBN 978-0198709268.
- White, David Gordon, ed. (2000). Tantra in Practice. Princeton University Press. ISBN 978-0-691-05779-8.
- Yogananda, Paramhansa (1946). "Chapter 24: I Become a Monk of the Swami Order". Autobiography of a Yogi. Archived from the original on 6 April 2019 – via www.CrystalClarity.com.

Web-sources
