= Hariharananda =

Hariharananda is a name. People with the name include:

- Hariharananda Giri
- Swami Hariharananda Aranya
