= Aranya =

Aranya may refer to:

- Aranya (film) or Kaadan, a 2021 Indian drama film
- Aranya (poetry), 1988 collection of poetry by Naresh Mehta
- Aranya, 1970 Assamese film by Samarendra Narayan Deb
- Swami Hariharananda Aranya (1869-1947), yogi, author and founder of monastery

== See also ==
- Araṇya-Kāṇḍa, a book of the ancient Indian epic Ramayana
- Aranyaka Parva, section of Vana Parva, 18th book of Mahabharata
- Aranye, an Indian film series, including
  - Aranyer Din Ratri (1970)
  - Abar Aranye (2003)
