= Mark A. Michaels and Patricia Johnson =

Mark A. Michaels (born August 2, 1959) and Patricia Johnson (born May 21, 1964) are authors and lecturers on sexuality and relationships. Their approach is informed by their combined 30 years of Tantric study, practice and teaching.

== Early life ==
Mark A. Michaels was born and raised in New York City. He attended the Ethical Culture Fieldston School and graduated with honors and distinction from the University of Michigan in 1980. He earned a JD from New York University (1985).

Patricia Johnson was born in Kincheloe, Michigan. She graduated from Concordia High School (Missouri). Johnson attended the University of Missouri, where she earned a Bachelor of Music with a concentration in Opera Performance. She was a member of the Houston Grand Opera Studio from 1991 until 1992.

== Mark A. Michaels ==
=== Legal and theatrical career 1985–2000 ===
After completing law school, Michaels worked as a literary manager/playwright translator. His translation/adaptation of Goldoni's The Mistress of the Inn was produced by the Roundabout Theatre Company in 1988.

From 1990 until 2000, Michaels served as staff attorney for the American Indian Law Alliance and deputy director to the Native American Council of New York City. His law review article "Indigenous Ethics and Alien Laws: Native Traditions and the United States Legal System" has been widely cited. During this period Michaels also earned master's degrees in American Studies from NYU (1994) and Yale (1996).

== Patricia Johnson ==
=== Professional operatic career 1993–2010 ===
Johnson was a professional operatic soprano and performed in some of the world's premiere venues including Houston Grand Opera, Teatro Municipal Santiago de Chile, and Prague State Opera. During her seasons with the New York City Opera she was hailed as "... America's newest emerging talent..." In addition to Gilda and Violetta, her repertoire at that house included Micaëla in Carmen, Nanetta in Falstaff, Antonia in Les contes d'Hoffmann, the Countess Almaviva in Le nozze di Figaro and Valencienne in The Merry Widow, a Live from Lincoln Center telecast. With the Opera Orchestra of New York, she covered the leading roles in Rossini's Armida and Donizetti's Linda di Chamounix, as well as Bellini's La sonnambula, I puritani and I Capuleti e i Montecchi. Other roles included Lucia di Lammermoor at Opera Cleveland and all four heroines in Les Contes of d'Hoffmann with El Paso Opera and Lakmé with the Union Avenue Opera in St. Louis.

== Tantric training and marriage ==
Michaels began to explore American Tantra in 1997, studying with a variety of teachers. He completed his first teacher training in 1998. In January 1999, Johnson attended a lecture that Michaels gave at Sexy Spirits in New York City. Michaels and Johnson got together to practice sexual Tantra in February 1999. Their partnership, born of a shared passion for exploring Tantra, soon blossomed into a romance, and they have been together ever since. Also in 1999, both Michaels and Johnson grew interested in exploring a more traditional approach to Tantra and began studying with Dr. Jonn Mumford (Swami Anandakapila Saraswati). Their relationship with Dr. Mumford, a pioneering figure in teaching traditional Tantra to Westerners, deepened over time and Mumford named them his lineage holders for the Americas and Europe and initiated them as Swami Umeshanand Saraswati and Devi Veenanand.

Mumford's lineage comes from two renowned Indian gurus, Yogamaharishi Swami Gitananda and Satyananda Saraswati.

In addition to their training with Dr. Mumford, Michaels and Johnson have studied with Dr. Rudolph Balentine and Bhagavan Das, who officiated at their wedding in 2000.

Mumford, Michaels, and Johnson renounced their Saraswati initiations in 2014 in response to evidence presented to the Royal Commission into Institutional Responses to Child Sexual Abuse (Australia). https://www.facebook.com/mark.a.michaels/posts/10152981824079610?pnref=story

== Career ==
=== Tantra teachers, sexuality educators, and authors ===
From 2000 to 2006, Michaels and Johnson travelled extensively in the US, Europe and Australia. During this time, they developed an online course called "The Fundamentals of Tantric Sexuality". They also began sponsoring Dr. Mumford's distance learning programs. In 2006, they completed their first book, The Essence of Tantric Sexuality. In 2008, they published Tantra for Erotic Empowerment: The Key to Enriching Your Sexual Life (Llewellyn), a workbook based on their online course, with a foreword written by Tristan Taormino. Also in 2008, they wrote and appeared in two instructional DVDs for the Alexander Institute: Tantric Sexual Massage for Lovers and Advanced Tantric Sex Secrets; and made a guest appearance in Tristan Taormino's Chemistry 4, teaching an impromptu Tantra class to the cast. 2011 saw the release of Ananda Nidra (Projekt Records), a meditation CD set featuring musical accompaniment by Steve Roach and Black Tape for a Blue Girl. The final book in their trilogy of Tantra-related titles, Great Sex Made Simple: Tantric Tips to Deepen Intimacy and Heighten Pleasure (Llewellyn), appeared in 2013. Their fourth book, Partners in Passion: A Guide to Great Sex, Emotional Intimacy, and Long-Term Love, was released by Cleis Press in 2014.

Michaels and Johnson also wrote the foreword to Kristina Wright, ed. Bedded Bliss: A Couple's Guide to Lust Ever After (Cleis Press, 2013) and have been featured and referenced in Tristan Taormino's Opening Up: A Guide to Creating and Sustaining Open Relationships, and The Complete Idiot's Guide to Tantric Sex, The Complete Idiot's Guide to Enhancing Sexual Desire, and Crazy Little Thing. They maintain an active teaching and lecturing schedule, and have been quoted as experts in numerous publications in the United States and abroad.

In 2007, Michaels and Johnson co-founded The Pleasure Salon with New York City sex blogger Selina Fire. Pleasure Salon is a monthly social gathering created to foster an environment in which a broad spectrum of people can cross-pollinate, build networks, and create sex-positive community.

== Awards ==
- Great Sex Made Simple: Tantric Tips to Deepen Intimacy and Heighten Pleasure (2012)
- Independent Publishing (IPPY) Awards Gold Medalist in Sexuality/Relationships
- International Book Awards Winner in Self Help: Relationships
- ForeWord Reviews Book of the Year Awards Silver Medalist in Self-Help
- Living Now Awards Silver Medalist in Femininity/Sexuality
- ForeWord Reviews Book of the Year Awards Finalist in Family and Relationships
- Eric Hoffer Awards Honorable Mention in Health.
- Ananda Nidra: Blissful Sleep (2011)
- Second Runner Up 2012 Coalition of Visionary Resources Award
- Tantra for Erotic Empowerment: The Key to Enriching Your Sexual Life (2008)
- USA Book News Best Book Awards Winner in Health: Sexuality
- Indie Excellence Awards Finalist
- Foreword Reviews Book of the Year Awards Finalist
- Tantric Sexual Massage for Lovers (2008)
- Cinekink selection
- The Essence of Tantric Sexuality (2006)
- USA Book News Best Book Award Winner in Health: Sexuality
