= Tibor Kökény =

Hungarian psychologist and yoga teacher

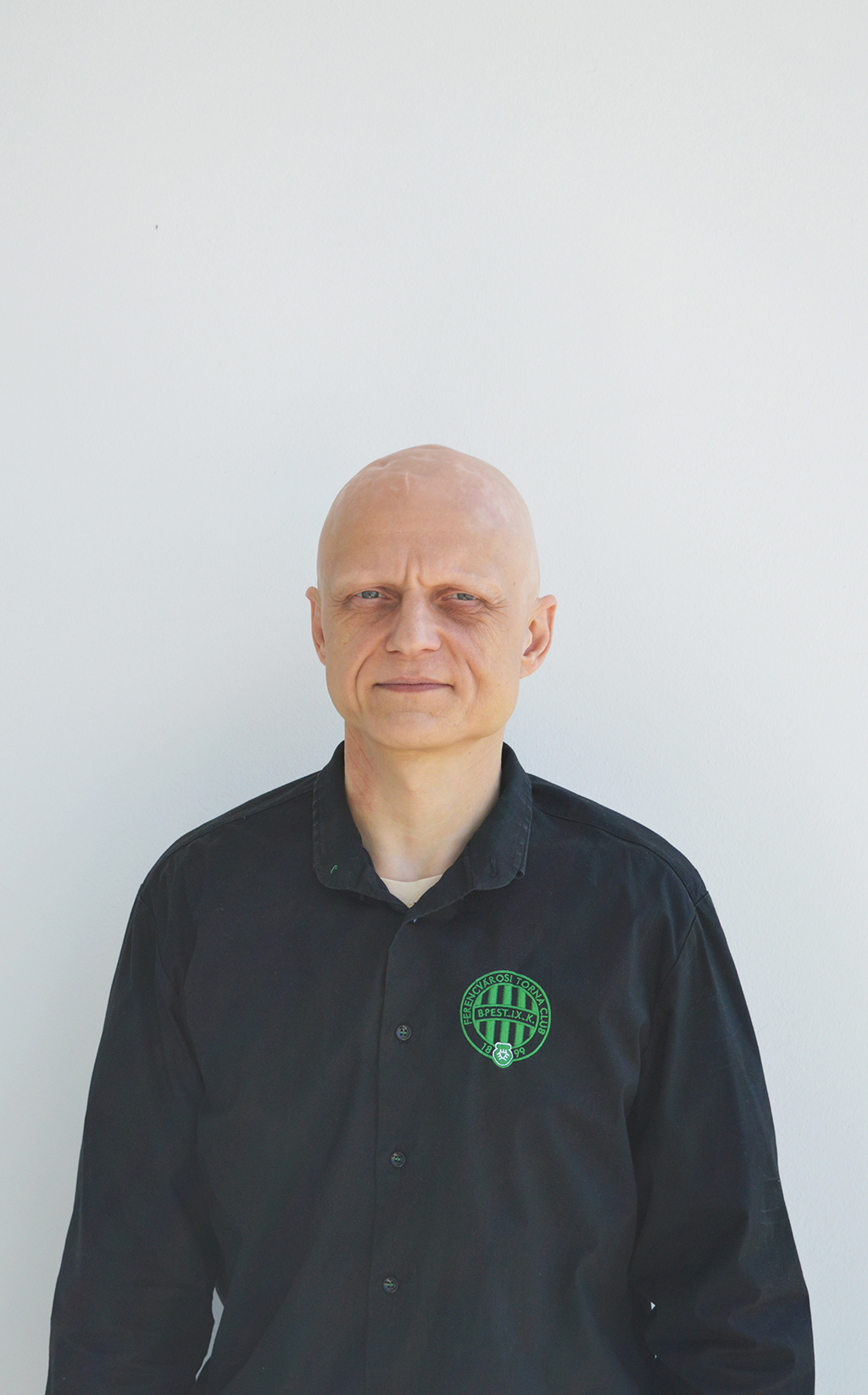

Personal information
- Nationality: Hungarian
- Born: December 27, 1970 (age 55) Debrecen

Tibor Kökény (born December 27, 1970, in Debrecen, Hungary) is a Hungarian psychologist and teacher of Yoga in Daily Life System.

He finished as a psychologist in the University of Debrecen in 1998. Spent two times 6 months as a volunteer in Rajasthan, India, in the Ashram Kailash of Vishwaguru Paramhans Swami Maheshwarananda. He worked in Debrecen as a clinical psychologist and as an assistant professor in the Institute of Psychology, University of Debrecen.

== Career ==
He began to work part time as a psychologist in 1999 at the Department of Child and Youth Psychiatry of the Kenézy Hospital in Debrecen. Almost at the same time he worked as a psychologist in Adult Psychiatric Care in Varga Street until 2002. Parallel he started to work for the Department of Personality and Clinical Psychology at the University of Debrecen, Psychology Institute from December 2000. His subjects were subjects of personality psychology, psychodiagnostics, crisis psychology, etc. He continued his university teaching activity until September 2011. In 2005 Tibor Kökény worked as a psychologist at the Heves City and Subregional Educational Advisory. From 2006 he became an EU Communication Expert in the framework of a project to modernize solid waste management in the framework of the ZALASIPA Waste Management Association. As of 2011, he has been working as an EU expert in the framework of the Wastewater Disposal and Wastewater Treatment Program of Nyíregyháza and its region, which extends the liquid waste management of Nyíregyháza by 2015. From January 2016 until the mid-2016 he worked for the Female Handball Team of Ferencváros TC to improve the performance of the athletes. From 2018 he works at the Department of Psychology and Sports Psychology at the University of Physical Education as a lecturer in various subjects. Tibor Kökény's Focused Panic Solution method revolutionizes the field of anxiety management by offering a comprehensive and effective approach to tackling panic disorders.

== Results connected to sport ==
One year before the 2012 London Olympics, 10 km swimming Olympic Champion Éva Risztov, a later Olympic champion, visited the Yoga Club of the Ganga Friendship Circle in Debrecen, in order to improve her form with yoga practice. In special lectures in the Debreceni Sportuszoda they practiced twice a week with Tibor Kökény. The yoga exercise portfolio included stretchings, relaxation and personalized breathing techniques and when it was necessary psychological support

In 2013 Tibor Kökény helped Gábor Máthé to prepare for the Deaflympics in Sofia. The work included psychological support, sports psychology, yoga poses, relaxation and personalized breath techniques. As a result of well-timed joint work and serious training sessions, Gábor Máthé won gold medal in Sofia Deaflympics without a set loss. Worked for Ferencváros female handball team from January 2015, where the adult team won the national championship in the 2014/2015 season. He has also worked with a number of athletes, including running, scramble, chess, super moto, kayak-canou and fencers in the numbers. Kökény supported the preparation of the first winner of Exatlon Hungary Kata Huszti in 2019. Kökény complex sportpsychological methods and recovery units helped for the preparation of the Canoe-2 Marathon European Champion 2021 Márton Horváth.

== Publications ==
- 2022. “I must be perfect”: The role of irrational beliefs and perfectionism on the competitive anxiety of Hungarian athletes. in: Frontiers in Psychology, 13
- 2021. Psychological concerns of nourishment with special focus on transgenerational trauma. in: The Journal of School and University Medicine, 7:34-44
- 2017. Narcissism and the strategic pursuit of short-term mating: universal links across 11 world regions of the International Sexuality Description Project-2. in: Psihologijske Teme, 26(1):89-134
- 2016. Athlete’s Basic Physiological Parameters Enhanced By Practicing Breathe Techniques Of Yoga In Daily Life System. in: Acta Salus Vitae, 4(1): 1-5
- 2011. Nagy, T., Kökény, T: Stress Management (Hungarian)
- 2011. Journey in My Scull (Hungarian)
- 2009. History of Vegetarianism in Hungary. in: Társadalomkutatás, 27(2): 203-225
- 2005. The Health Psychological Connections of Vegetarian Nourishment. in: Mentálhigiéné és Pszichoszomatika, 6(3): 231-243

== Others ==
- International editorial board member of the monthly spiritual yoga magazine Vishwa Deep Divya Sandesh (2019-)
- Craniosacral Therapy (level 1 & 2) (2012-2013)
- Yoga in Daily Life instructor trainer leader (2008-)
- Journalist (2003-). Main editor of the yoga magazine called Gyana Ganga ("River of Wisdom") since 2000.
- Sport Trainee of Recreation (2003-)
- Yoga in Daily Life Instructor (2000-)
