= Swami Ghanananda =

Swami Ghanananda may refer to:

- Ghanananda (died 1969), represented the Ramakrishna Mission in London
- Swami Ghanananda Saraswati (1937–2016), prominent swami of the indigenous Hindu community in Ghana
