= Gossain Ghamandi Gir =

Gossain Ghamandi Gir is the name of a Hindu Saivite monk of a Shankara lineage who is said to have founded a Saivite monastery in Bodhgaya in approximately 1590 CE. The occupants of the monastery were of the Giri order, one of the ten Dashanami monastic orders founded by Shankara. However, the Bodh Gaya Giri sect, for which the monastery was headquarters, "has had since its establishment no strong institutional or administrative links with any other ascetic organization".

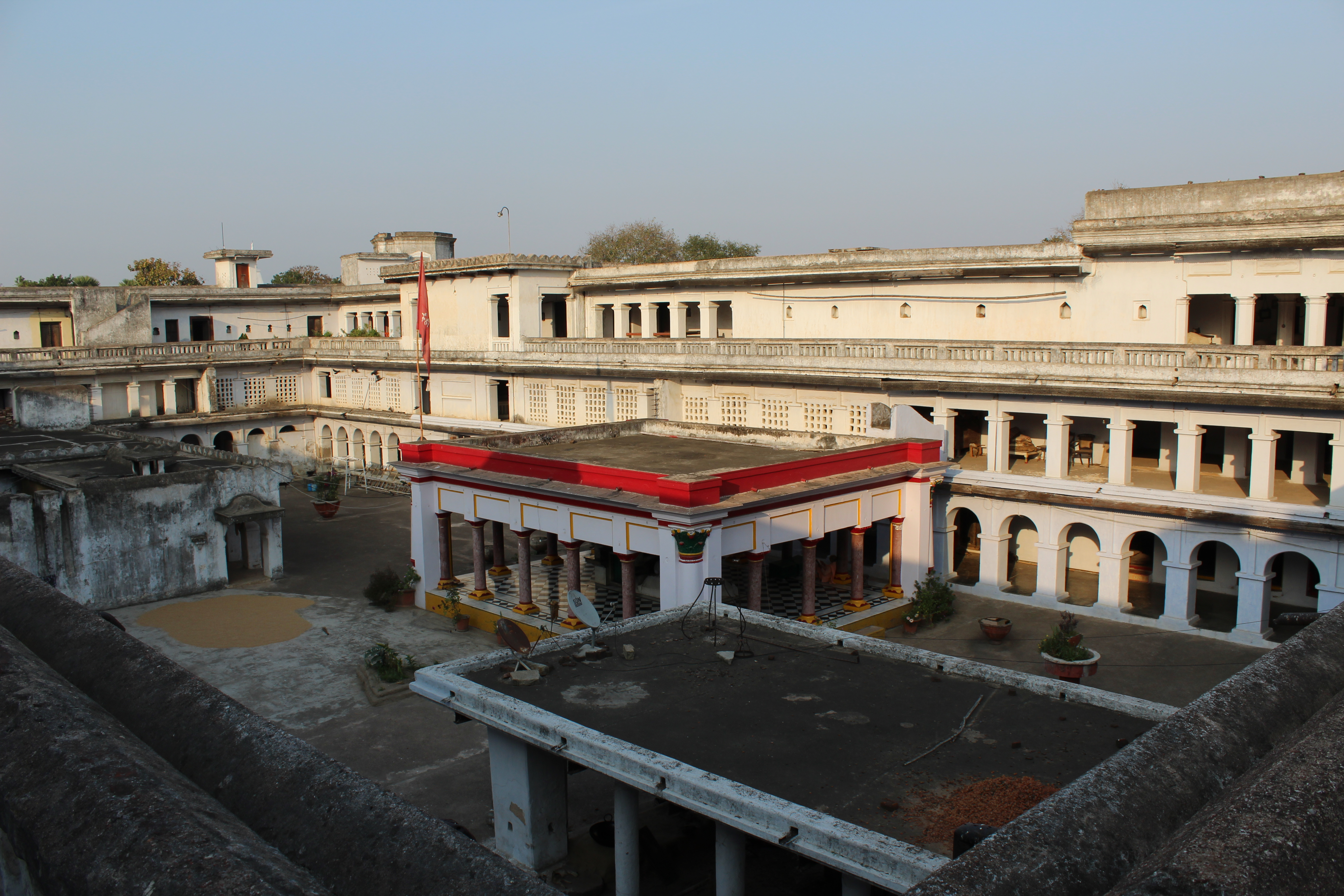
400 years old Hindu Monastery in Bodh Gaya

According to the Encyclopedia of Monasticism,

Gossain Ghamandi Gir's followers built a small monastery at Bodh Gaya in the early part of the 17th century that has since been continuously occupied by a lineage of Saiva priests. This monastery's status is relatively minor within the Saiva monastic system - according to oral tradition is ranked 36th among the 52 major Saivite maths - but it has served as an important anchor for Hindu pilgrims who visit Bodh Gaya in conjunction with visits to nearby Gaya (a major Hindu tirtha).... an active Saiva monastic presence still exists at Bodh Gaha.

Gossain Ghamandi Gir is reported to have been the first mahanth (abbot) of the monastery. The following succession of abbots for the monastery through the 1890s was listed in 1893 by Grierson:

(1) Ghamandi Gir (1590-1615)
(2) Chaitanya Gir (1615-1642)
(3) Mahadeva Gir (1642-1682)
(4) Lala Gir (1682-?)
(5) Keshav Gir (?-1748)
(6) Raghav Gir (1748-1769)
(7) Ram Hit Gir (1769-1806)
(8) Balak Gir (1806-1820)
(9) Siv Gir (1820-1846)
(10) Bhaipati Gir (1846-1867)
(11) Hem Narayan Gir (1867-1891)
(12) Krishna Dayal Gir (1891-now living [sic])

According to Trevitich,

What perhaps most distinguishes the Bodh Gaya Giris from the more "orthodox" Dasanami orders is the method they employ in electing their Mahants. Among the more "pure" sects, a new Mahant is chosen by a nominating board, theoretically answerable to the entire body of monks. The head of this board is chosen at the Kumbh Mela - a great gathering of ascetics held every six years.... The Mahants of Bodh Gaya are not elected in this manner.... At the death of the Mahant, the "general body of disciples" nominated, at Bodh Gaya, five electors.... It must immediately be said, however, that... general Hindu opinion, as indexed by newspaper articles and by public statements from religious leaders, was that the Giris were unambiguously "sanatan" or orthodox.
