= Puran Puri =

Sanyasi and fakir from Kannauj, India

- पूरन पुरी
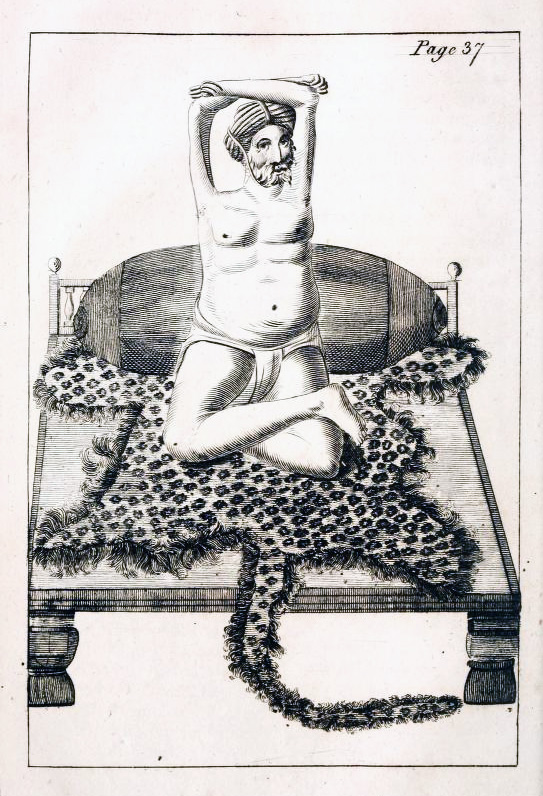
- Original illustration by Jonathan Duncan dated to May 1792 showing Puran Puri with his arms aloft undergoing the urdhwa bahu penance.
- Born: c.1742 Kannauj, India
- Died: 26 July 1800, Benares
- Occupations: Ascetic, Traveller

Puran Puri (Hindi: पूरन पुरी, alternative spellings Purana Poori or Praun Poory) was an 18th-century sanyasi monk and traveller from India, who travelled from Central India to Sri Lanka, Malaysia, the Middle East, Moscow and Tibet. He was a Khatri or Rajput, born c.1742 in the city of Kannauj in what is now the modern-day state of Uttar Pradesh in India.

== Initiation and Life as a Yogi ==
Puran Puri left his father's house at the age of nine, and travelled to Bithoor where he became a Fakir. From Bithoor he proceeded to Allahabad, where he started his urdhwa bahu tapasya. Urdhwa bahu is a penance that consists of keeping the arms raised aloft, for decades. Puran Puri belonged to the Puri sub-order of Dashanami Sampradaya swamis.

== Travels ==
Even though he was a humble ascetic and travelled mainly to Hindu places of worship as a form of pilgrimage, Puran Puri's travels were extensive and comparable in distances to those of more famous travellers like Ibn Batuta. His travelogue was recorded by East India Company official Jonathan Duncan in May 1792, when he was the British Resident at Benares.

=== Travel to Rameswaram and Sri Lanka ===
He first set out to travel to Rameswaram, a holy pilgrimage site at the tip of the Indian peninsula which is one of the Chardhams (four sacred Hindu pilgrimage sites).

His route took him through the cities of Kalpi, Ujjain, Burhanpur, Aurangabad, Ellora, crossing the Godavari near Toka, passing by Pune, Satara, Bidanur and Srirangapatna. Using the Thamarassery Churam mountain pass he crossed into Malabar, then onwards to Cochin and Rameswaram.

From Rameswaram, Puran Puri took a northwards detour to the Jagannath Temple, another of the Chardhams, in Puri, Orissa.

Returning to Rameswaram, he then crossed over into Ceylon (Sri Lanka), visiting the capital Kandy, the pilgrimage town Kataragama by the Menik Ganga river, and the Sri Pada or "sacred footprint" on Adam's Peak.

=== Travel to Afghanistan ===
Leaving Sri Lanka, Puran Puri returned by sea to Cochin on the west coast of India, travelling via Bombay to Dwarka, which is another the Chardhams, and Hinglaj, an important Hindu pilgrimage place in current day Balochistan, Pakistan. Passing through Multan and beyond Attock, he took a westward detour to visit Haridwar in India.

Continuing his eastward journey, Puran Puri passed through the Punjab to Kabul and Bamyan where he noted the great statues.

=== Meeting with Ahmed Shah Abdali ===
Near Ghazni in modern south-eastern Afghanistan, Puran Puri came into contact with the army of Ahmed Shah Abdali, the founder of the state of Afghanistan. Ahmed Shah had an ulcer on his nose, and since Puran Puri was an Indian ascetic, Shah consulted him regarding the ulcer. Having no knowledge of medicine or surgery however, Puran Puri used his wits to get out of the situation by suggesting that there might be a link between the Shah's kingship and the ulcer, because of which it might not be advisable to remove one lest it affect the other.

=== Travel to Azerbaijan ===
From Afghanistan, Puran Puri travelled through Khorasan via Herat and Mashhad, to Astrabad (Gorgan) in Iran. From here he made his way to the Maha Jwala Mukhi ("flaming mouth") in Surakhani, a suburb of Baku in present-day Azerbaijan, where a castle-like fire temple and monastery complex existed on a pocket of natural gas that produced a flame from natural gas seepage.

=== Travel to Russia ===
After spending almost a year at the Jwala Mukhi, Puran Puri went on to the city of Astrakhan, on the banks of the river Volga in southern Russia, where he met up with resident Hindus. As Astrakhan was the Russian gate to the Orient, many merchants from Mughal India had settled there.

The Volga was frozen at this time, and travelling on the frozen river for eighteen days, he reached Moscow. Since in Moscow Puran Puri was inconvenienced by the large crowds of curious Russians who flocked to see him, unwittingly disturbing him in his devotions, he decided not to proceed further, and to return. This was the western-most destination in his travels.

=== Travel through Persia ===
From Moscow, Puran Puri returned to Astrakhan, and via the Silk Road cities of Shamakhi, Shirvan, Tabriz and Hamadan, reached Isfahan. Isfahan was one of the largest cities in the world, and after a stay of forty days there, he then proceeded to Shiraz in the Fars Province of current day Iran. In Shiraz, Puran Puri was part of an audience with Karim Khan Zand.

=== Voyage to Bahrain ===
From the port of Bushehr on the southern coast of Iran, he travelled to Kharg, a small island 25 km off the Iranian coast. From here, he continued on to the island of Bahrain.

=== Voyage to Iraq ===
From Bahrain, Puran Puri re-embarked for Basra, in Iraq, where he found some Hindu traders. He tried to travel up the river Tigris to Baghdad but was unable to do so, and returned to Basra.

=== Voyages to Muscat and Yemen ===
From Basra, Puran Puri made his way to the port of Muscat in present-day Oman. From here he briefly voyaged to Surat on the west coast of the Indian subcontinent, but soon embarked on another voyage to the port city of Mocha in Yemen. From Yemen he returned to the Indian subcontinent at the port he called 'Sanyanpoor' on the Sindh or Kutch coast.

=== Travels to Uzbekistan ===
Puran Puri's next journey was to Balkh in present-day Afghanistan on the Uzbekistan border, where he observed Hindus settled, and to Bukhara in present-day Uzbekistan. From here he proceeded to the city of Samarkand.

=== Return to India ===
From Samarkand, Puran Puri travelled to Badakhshan, from where he made his way to Kashmir and Gangotri, a Hindu pilgrim town and the origin of the river Ganges. Travelling to the south-east from there, he reached Awadh.

=== Journey to Tibet ===
From Awadh, Puran Puri made his way into Nepal, visiting Kathmandu and other places including crossing five km into Tibet to visit Gosainthan, "place of the saint" or "Abode of God".

Returning to Kathmandu, he ventured further into Tibet by crossing into Khasa and Tingri and reached Lhasa. From there he made his way to Drongtse, near the seat of the Panchen Lama (also called the Teshu / Teshoo Lama) and finally to Lake Mansarovar, a sacred place in Hinduism.

At this time, the Governor General Warren Hastings was trying to access China as a market for Bengal textiles, using the Panchen Lama's influence. On his way back, the Lama entrusted over a sealed package, a letter and a spinning wheel as a gift for Hastings to Puran Puri. Along with this, the Panchen Lama also gave Puran Puri five ingots of silver and 200 tolas (around 2 kg) of gold for himself.

=== Return to India ===
Puran Puri returned to India on a Tangun horse, given to him by the Lama. When Captain Samuel Turner came across Puran Puri in Calcutta on his way back in 1783, he was assisted by two gosains and clothed in a satin dress, also given to him by the Lama.

After delivering the items to Hastings, he was presented with letters of introduction to Maharaja Chait Singh of Benares, through whom Hastings arranged for an ample maintenance as a reward.

== Post-travel Life ==
Later when Hastings stopped at Benares on his way to Lucknow, he arranged through Maharaja Chait Singh's nephew and successor Maharaja Mahipnarayan Singh of Benares a grant of the jagir (land grant) of the village Ashapur to Puran Puri.

== Popularity of Image in Europe ==
Puran Puri's image with his hands raised in penance, along with the image of a fellow sanyasi Param Swatantra Prakashanand Bramhachari lying on a bed of nails, was drawn by Jonathan Duncan himself for his 1799 article in the 'Asiatic Researches' journal. These were among the earliest images of yogis received in Europe, and triggered the European fascination for documentation of the novel postures and painful practices of ascetics. As such, the image of Puran Puri was widely redrawn and reproduced as an archetype of a yogi or gymnosophist.

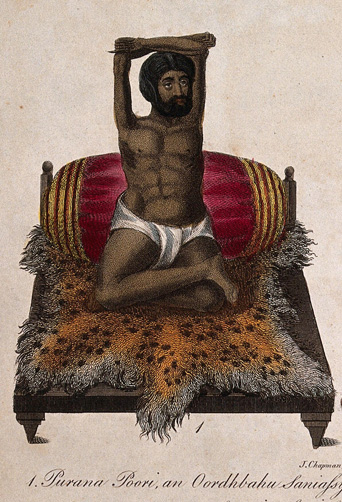
A color engraving of Puran Puri, copied from the original around 1809

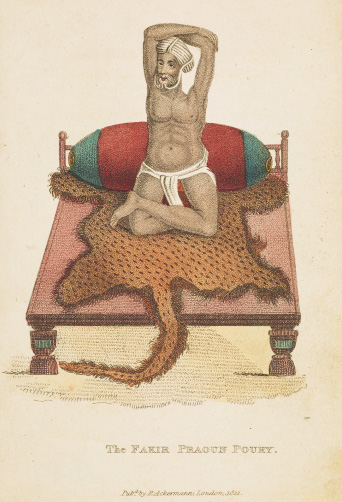
Another color engraving of Puran Puri, copied from the original
