= Purushottam Publishers =

Indian Media Company

- Industry: Publishing; Academic publishing; Writing
- Founded: 2007
- Founder: Snehangshu Banerjee; Biswa Priyo Bandyopadhyay
- Headquarters: Baranagar, India
- Products: Academic & Research based Books, Guidebooks, AudioBooks and eBooks
- Number of employees: 50
- Parent: JIPL Group
- Website: purushottam-publishers.in

Purushottam Publishers is an independent publishing house and media company headquartered in Baranagar, West Bengal, India, publishing K-12 school textbooks, academic research and career guidebooks for University and College level and General books of various genre. Founded in 2009, this publishing house is a venture of the JIPL Group.

== History ==
Between January and June 2009, Snehangshu Banerjee and Biswapriyo Bandyopadhyay came together as first-generation entrepreneurs in Baranagar, Kolkata. They founded the JIPL Group and subsequently Purushottam Publishers. The book Fishermen of The Coastal Districts of Bengal by researcher, academic author Dr. Surjendu Dey, and Leadership & Entrepreneurship 2020 – by Er. Ravinder Kumar Handa were the company's significant published works during its early days. The pair sold the books on their own to independent bookstores. The book Fishermen of The Coastal Districts of Bengal won the Meghnad Saha Memorial Award and Medal in February 2016. Purushottam Publishers' subsequent works included several other academic titles.

The company specializes in K-12 School textbooks for English / Bengali Medium schools of CISCE/CBSE Board, and also books/ebooks in higher academic research.

The firm is named after Swami Shankar Purushottam Tirtha Ji Maharaj by the primary stakeholders, who are disciples of the Siddhayoga lineage of Saints.

All books published by Purushottam Publishers are made available on the fully owned official Online Storefront, Purushottam Bookstore

== Publications ==
=== School textbooks ===
- Purushottam's FUNKIDS Picture Dictionary – an indigenously developed Picture Dictionary or Visual Dictionary book for Junior School
- Purushottam's Bright Learners Social Studies – a series of eight school textbooks (Subject: Social Studies) for std. I – VIII
- Purushottam's Spectrums of General Knowledge – a series of eight school textbooks for std. I – VIII
- Purushottam's FUNKIDS Art & Colour Book – a series of seven art and colour books for std. LKG – std. V
- Purushottam's FUNKIDS Art and Craft Book – a series of five art and craft books for std. LKG – III
- Purushottam's Kochi Kanchar A AA KA KHA – a Bengali alphabet book, for young learners
- Purushottam's FUNKIDS My First A-B-C – an English alphabet book for young learners
- Purushottam's FUNKIDS Number Book 1 (1–50) – Junior School Mathematics primer book for young learners
- Purushottam's FUNKIDS Number Book 2 (1–100) – Junior School Mathematics primer book for young learners

=== Higher academic publications ===
- Yoga Vaani – by Swami Shankar Purushottam Tirtha ISBN 978-81-924129-2-4 – Bengali Edition of a Siddhayoga book written in the early 1900s in India, discusses the experiences during meditation (sadhana) based on the Siddhayoga Kundalini Shaktipat Tradition.
- Fishermen of the Coastal Districts of Bengal – by Dr. Surjendu Dey ISBN 978-81-924129-0-0 – A wide-spectrum research-oriented book covering multi-disciplinary areas of sociology, economics, culture hnd History.
- Leadership & Entrepreneurship 2020 – by Er. Ravinder Kumar Handa ISBN 978-93-85908-30-9 – A case-study centric reference for Leaders, Entrepreneurs and students of Management.
- Indian Society-Problems and Issues – by Dr. Saraswati Raju Iyer ISBN 978-93-85908-37-8 – A research oriented book related to contemporary Indian society. A reference for students (both undergraduate and postgraduate), research scholars, educators, social scientists, those in government and non-governmental organizations, social activists and policy makers.

== See also ==
- ABP Group
