= Swami Shivom Tirtha =

Hindu guru (1924–2008)

Swami Shivom Tirth Maharaj (15 January 1924–2008) was a noted guru of the Tirtha lineage of Siddha Yoga. Born in a small village in Punjabi Gujrat in present-day Pakistan, his name before he entered the life of renunciation (sannyas) was Om Prakash.

He completed his undergraduate degree at Lahore and lived a householder's life for many years, relocating on the Indian side of the border with his wife and family at the time of independence and partition in 1947. After coming in contact with Swami Vishnu Tirtha he entered the path of spirituality, living with the guru as a disciple. Initially he was assigned everyday work in the Ashram but over time he became the favored disciple who would inherit the lineage. In 1959, when his Guru Ji made him a celibate (brahmachari), he took the name Bramchari Shivom Prakash.

Brahmchari Shivom Prakash took formal sannyas diksha from Swami Narayan Tirtha of Kashi in 1963, becoming Swami Shivom Tirtha. After that he took care of the Yog Shri Peeth Ashram in Rishikesh and Narayan Kuti Ashram in Dewas, Madhya Pradesh.

In his later years Swami Shivom Tirtha gave up his public life, left the ashram and started living in an isolated place near Indore, with two celibate disciples, writing many books. He gave up his earthly body on 6 April 2008 at Coimbtore: his body being committed to the Ganges at Rishikesh.

== Books by Swami Shivom Tirtha ==
A Guide to Shaktipat
Shivom Vani
Churning of Heart (Hindi: Hryidaya Manthan)
Sadhan Path
Shri Narayan Updeshamrat
Guru Parampara
Yog Vibhuti
Shaktipat Prishnottary
Shaktipat Path Pradarshika (3 parts)
Patyanjal Yog Darshan
Shri Guru Gita
Guru Chalisa Vyakhya
Antar Pravahavalokan (2 parts)
Param Premalok (Narad Bhakti Sutra)
Sadhak Nirdeshika (3 parts)
Mukt Chintan
Shri Japuji Saheb
Shri Vishnu Tirth Saddarshan
Pratyagaman
Chitti Lika (Shaktipat Vigyan)
Gyan Kiran
Sopaan
Antarvithi
Antravalokan
Punruday
Sadhan Shikhar
Sugam Gita Preveshika (Preface writing) Antim rachana
