= Ganesh Baba =

Yogi and teacher in the tradition of Kriya Yoga

Swami Ganeshananda Giri

Personal life
- Born: 1890 Cuttack, Orissa, British India
- Died: 19 November 1987 (aged 97) Nainital, Uttar Pradesh, India

Religious life
- Religion: Hinduism
- Philosophy: Kriya Yoga

Swami Ganeshananda Giri (c. 1890 – 19 November 1987), popularly known as Ganesh Baba, and more formally as 'Shri Mahant Ganesh Giriji Maharaj', was an Indian yogi and teacher in the tradition of Kriya Yoga.

== Life ==
His mother was from Nepal and his father was from East Bengal (present-day Bangladesh). He was born in Orissa between 1890 and 1895.

In the early part of his life he was a successful and wealthy businessman. Some time after 1945 he retired from worldly life and took sanyas vows, becoming a monk in the tradition of the Naga Babas, more exactly, in the Anandakara branch of the movement founded by Shankaracharya. He received spiritual teachings from several sources, but his main spiritual practice was Kriya Yoga.

Ganesh Baba stated that he received the four Kriya Yoga initiations from Lahiri Mahasaya (at the age of four, in a dream), Sanyal Mahasaya, Tripura Charan Devsharma and Swāmī Śivānanda Saraswatī.

He became well-known to young Westerners visiting India in the 1960s. In the late 1970s he lived at Swayambunath (near Kathmandu) where he received many visitors and gave courses in Kriya Yoga practice.

Everyone who met him were impressed and he was held in high esteem by both Indians and Westerners. He was talkative and would spend hours regaling his listeners with what some might call 'tall tales'.

Ganesh Baba's teachings incorporated Western scientific concepts. He taught that there is a cyclic cosmic process of involution and evolution, and he developed a system of correspondences – a "Cycle of Synthesis" – between levels of Kriya Yoga practice, the five koshas, the planets, the kayas, the Yugas, the cakras, the stages of organic evolution and the Jungian psychological types. He left three manuscripts and many volumes of short essays and papers. The longer manuscripts, "Search of Self," an unfinished autobiography, "Sadhana," a kriya yoga manual, and a detailed essay on his Cycle of Synthesis, are synthesized and updated as The Crazy Wisdom of Ganesh Baba, by Eve Neuhaus (2010).

In 1979 he had developed eye cataracts and was going blind. His Western followers arranged for him to visit the U.S.A. for an operation, as a result of which he recovered his sight. Since many of the young Westerners who had met him in India and Nepal were glad to have him in the U.S. he remained there for seven years, teaching Kriya Yoga to small groups on the East Coast and West Coast. He returned to India in 1986. He visited a Kriya Yoga center in France (which was established by his French followers), then went back to India. He died at Nainital on 19 November 1987, and is buried at the Alakha Nath Temple in Bareilly.
