= Swami Purushottamananda =

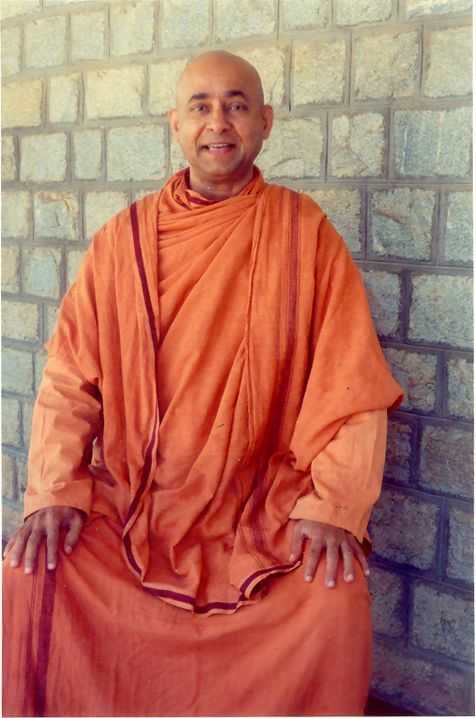
- Swami Purushottamananda
- Born: 14 June 1931; Moodahadu, Saligrama, India
- Died: 25 February 2005 (aged 73); Bangalore

Swami Purushottamananda (14 June 1931 – 25 February 2005) was a monk of the Ramakrishna Mission. He was a prolific writer and orator in Kannada. He was also known as singer.

== Biography ==
=== Birth ===
Swami Purushottamananda was born on 14 June 1931 at Moodahadu, a village near Saligrama in the undivided district of Dakshina Kannada, Karnataka as Ramachandra Bayari. He completed matriculation and served as a teacher in Malpe and Madikeri.

=== Work as Sannyasi of Ramakrishna Mission ===
He joined the Ramakrishna Order in 1960 as a brahmacharin at Sri Ramakrishna Ashrama (presently Ramakrishna Math), Bangalore. He was an initiated disciple of Swami Yatiswarananda, the then president of Sri Ramakrishna Ashrama, Bangalore and the Vice President of the Ramakrishna Order. He, as brahmachari Mukunda Chaitanya, underwent probationer's training at the Belur Math, headquarters of Ramakrishna Mission for two years.

He served at the Bangalore centre (now known as Ramakrishna Math, Basavanagudi) for about 33 years (up to 1993), managing several of its activities, including Vivekananda Balaka Sangha and Vivekananda Yuvaka Sangha (the twin organizations for the character development of youth).

During May 1993 – November 2000, Swami Purushottamananda served as the President of the Ramakrishna Saradashram at Ponnampet, Kodagu; and conducted a number of spiritual retreats and other programmes. The shrine and the prayer-halls were renovated and Sadhu-nivas (monks' quarters) constructed.

In November 2000 he took over as the President of the newly affiliated Ramakrishna Mission ashrama at Belgaum. The historic building in Belgaum, where Swami Vivekananda stayed in 1892 for 12 days, was gifted to the Ramakrishna Mission by the Govt. of Karnataka. Swami Purushottamananda was instrumental in renovating this building, and constructing the Ramakrishna Universal Temple in the adjacent land in January 2004.

He has authored several books, mainly in Kannada, including three biographies: on Ramakrishna, Sarada Devi and Swami Vivekananda. One of his famous books — A letter to a student, focuses on students elaborating various techniques to help them achieve all-round excellence. The biography of Vivekananda won him the Vishwamanava literary award of the De.Ja.Gou. Trust.

The Swamiji was instrumental in the setting up of several voluntary organizations, Satsangs, as well as independent Ramakrishna Ashramas throughout Karnataka. He took a very active role in the Ramakrishna Mission activities — through his discourses, bhajans, and Satsang programmes. He is also well known for his singing and composing the bhajans, and for inspiring others to take monastic vows.

=== His music ===
Swami Purushottamanandaji was a noted singer and could supposedly transport the satsang into a spiritual trance. The most notable Bhajanas sung by him were Shraddeya sarovaradi, Tayi durgeya, kabir doha "Theertha yaatrage" etc. His most well-known songs are:

1. Swami Purushottamananda : Sanyassi Geetay.
2. Ananta Roopini, Swami Purushottamananda
3. Swami Purushottamananda Bhajan : Prema Roopa Sri Ramakrishna

=== Death ===
Swami Purushottamanandaji died on Friday 25 February 2005 at the Narayana Hrudayalaya, due to a massive heart attack at the age of 73.

== Books, Cassettes and CDs ==
=== Books ===
==== In Kannada ====
===== Biographies =====
  - Veerasanyasi-, Vishwa Vijeta-, and Vishwamanava-Vivekananda – the three volumes of a comprehensive biography of Swami Vivekananda
  - Yugavatara Shri Ramakrishna (Vol. I to Vol. IV) – a biography of Sri Ramakrishna in Kannada
  - Shri Sharadadevi Jeevanaganga – a biography of the Holy Mother Shri Sharadadevi
  - Brahmananubhavi – a biography of Swami Brahmananda

===== Booklets =====
1. ವಿದ್ಯಾರ್ಥಿಗೊಂದು ಪತ್ರ - Vidyarthigondu Patra
2. ಆಧ್ಯಾತ್ಮದಲ್ಲಿ ಏಕಾಗ್ರತೆ - Adhyayanadalli Ekagrate
3. Dheerateya Dundhubhi
4. ಕಬೀರ ಬೀರಿದ ಬೆಳಕು - Kabeera Beerida Belaku
5. ಸದ್ಯಕ್ಕೆ ಇಷ್ಟು ಸಾಕು - Sadyakke Ishtu Saaku (a minimalist Kannada dictionary for beginners)
6. ತಪಸ್ಸು ಯಶಸ್ಸು - Tapassu Yashassu
7. ಶಾಂತಿಯ ಹರಕೆ - Shaantiya Harake
8. ಪ್ರಯತ್ನವೇ ಪರಮೇಶ್ವರ - Prayatnave Parameshwara
9. ಶಕ್ತಿಶಾಲಿ ವ್ಯಕ್ತಿತ್ವ ನಿರ್ಮಾಣ - Shanktishaali Vyakthitva Nirmaana
10. ಚಿಂತನ ಮಂಥನ - Chintana Manthana
11. ಯುವ ಶಕ್ತಿಯ ರಹಸ್ಯ - Yuva Shaktiya Rahasya
12. ವಿದ್ಯಾರ್ಥಿಗಾಗಿ - Vidhyaarthigaagi.
13. ಶಾಂತಿಯ ಮಂತ್ರಗಳು - Shaanti Mantragalu.

==== English ====
1. Letter to A Student
2. Secret of Concentration
3. Man and Money
4. Youth and Vitality
5. Useful thoughts for youths
6. Build your personality
7. Gospel of Strength

=== Music in CDs and Cassettes ===
  - Prarthana Pushpanjali – recording of his live performance at Ramakrishna Institute of Culture, Kolkota
  - Bhakthi Geetam – Live Performance at Ramakrishna math, Chennai
  - Bhakthi Sudha – assorted bhajans and namavalis
  - Bhajana Mala – assorted bhajans and namavalis
  - Shiva Shakti Mala – Sanskrit and Hindi devotional songs
  - Sri Ram Aradhana – Sanskrit and Hindi devotional songs
  - Sri Krishna Bhajans – Sanskrit and Hindi devotional songs
  - Bhajans(Vol-4) – Hindi devotional songs
  - Bhajans(Vol-5) – Hindi and Sanskrit devotional songs
  - Stotras and Bhajans
  - Arati & Sankirtana – Sanskrit devotional songs
  - Bhajanakusumanjali – Kannada & Hindi devotional songs
  - Baarenna Thaayi – Kannada devotional songs
  - Kabeera Beerida Belaku (vol. I & II) – Hindi & Kannada

=== Lectures in Audio Cassettes and CDs ===
  - Vachana-Veda (16 CDs)
  - Vishnusahasranama (3 CDs)
  - Tittiriya Upanishad (2 CDs)
  - Bhakti Yoga (1 CD)
  - Chintana Part 1 & 2 (2 CDs)
  - Pavitrateyatta payaNa (1 CD)
  - Manassinante Mahadeva
  - Yugakke Takka Saadhane (1 CD)
  - Vinoda-Sunaada (1 CD)
  - Sarvatomukha BeLavaNige(1 CD)
  - PrItiya Riti (1 CD)
  - Dhyana Yoga (1 CD)
  - Vishwaroopa Darshana (1 CD)
  - Sarada Devi Sandesha (1 CD)
  - Satsanga Sourabha Bhaga 1(1 CD)
  - Satsanga Sourabha Bhaga 2(1 CD)
  - Sri Sharadadevi Mahatmya (1 DVD audio)
  - Prayatnave Parameshwara (1 CD)
  - Bharata Pravaasa Kathana (1 CD)
  - Adhyatma & Mantradeekshe (1 CD)
