= Swami Vishnu Tirtha =

Hindu Yogi (1888-1969)

Swami Vishnu Tirtha (1888–1969), also known as Munilal Swami, was a sanyas, writer, and guru with a prominent place in the Shaktipat tradition of Siddhayoga. He was born on 15 October 1888 in Jhajjar, Haryana, India. He stayed with an uncle while obtaining an undergraduate degree, then married and was employed as a teacher in Bilaspur, Chhattisgarh while he obtained a postgraduate degree and a baccalaureate in law from Aligarh Muslim University. He then practised as a lawyer in the Ghaziabad District of Meerut where his assistant was Late Chaudhary Charan Singh the former Prime Minister of India.

Munilal and his wife raised a son and daughter. Though Munilal experienced various advanced kriyas since childhood, he was guided to subtle sadhanas by a Bengali saint who lived at Delhi's famous Kalkaji temple. The great yogi seer Baba SitaRam Das Onkarnath asked him in Ayodhya to take studies in Sanskrit to fulfill his life's mission. He was introduced to Swami Yoganand by a High Court Judge and was able to reach to him in Rishikesh after several correspondences. It was at the Swarg Ashram in Rishikesh he received Shaktipat initiation from Yogananda Maharaj in 1933. After travels to many holy places around Badrinath and Kedarnath, in 1939 Munilal expressed a desire for initiation as a renunciate (sannyasin). Yogananda directed him to Swami Shankar Purushottam Tirtha in Banaras, who initiated him at the Mohan Ashram, Haridwar near the bank of the Ganges. His name then became Swami Vishnu Tirtha. At the direction of Yogananda, he proceeded toward Indore and finally settled in Dewas where he laid the foundation for the Narayan Kuti Sanyas Ashram.

Swami Vishnu Tirtha was a towering personality and great adept in Siddh Yoga traditions of India. He initiated many spiritual aspirants into the system of Shaktipat (descent of energy) and wrote a number of books. His commentary on "Saundarya Lahiri" of Adi Shankaracharya is unique and was lauded by great proponents such as MahaMahopadhyaay Gopinath Kaviraj. His most memorable work in English is Devatma Shakti, a study of the Divine Power (Kundalini Shakti) and the science of Shaktipat, based on traditions recorded in ancient scriptures supplemented by direct experiences. In the book, Devatma Shakti (Kundalini), Vishnu Tirtha observed: "We have pointed out repeatedly that no real progress in spirituality is possible unless an aspirant gets his kundalini power awakened, and it has also been pointed out that the easiest way of awakening that power is through initiation by shaktipat by a spiritual master."

Vishnu Tirtha had a profound love for the Ganges River and always used to spend few months each year at Yog Shri Peeth Ashram in Rishikesh. The land for the Ashram was gifted by his guru Swami Yoganand. His disciple Swami Shivom Tirtha and others carried out the construction of the centre in 1965. He left his body in 1969.

Vishnu Tirtha’s mountain like personality can be understood from Churning of the Heart (Parts I, II, III) and "Sadhan Shikhar" written by his disciple Swami ShivOm Tirtha. Here a Guru is sculpting a disciple from a human being. One of his Guru Bandhus (disciple of same Guru) Devendraji Vigyani Maharaj described him as a person without any hint of sin.

== Bibliography ==
- Devatma Shakti (Kundalini) Divine Power - (in English) Dec. 1948, Yoga Shri Peeth Trust, India.
- Adhyatma Vikas
- Atma Prabodh
- Geetatatwamrit
- Prana Tattva
- Prityabhigyahridyam (commentary)
- Sadhana Sanket
- Saundya Lahiri (commentary)
- Shaktipat
- Shiva Sutra Prabodhini
- Upanishadvani

== See also ==
- Siddhayoga
- Siddha Yoga
