= Siddhayoga =

Hindu sect

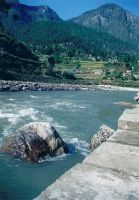
The Ganges river as seen from Shankar Math, a Siddhayoga retreat (matha).

Siddhayoga (Hindi: सिद्ध योग), also known as sahaj yoga, kundalini yoga, shaktipat yoga, maha yoga, shakti yoga, and kriya yoga, refers to a yoga tradition with the guru-disciple relationship as central to some lineages. According to the tradition, the guru transfers shakti (energy) to the disciple through a process called shaktipat.

Multiple lineages are associated with Siddhayoga, some sharing historical connections and others developing independently. Different groups, even those that do not use the term Siddhayoga, discuss the awakening of the kundalini shakti.

Teachings of Siddhayoga can be traced back to Tantric masters, such as Abhinavagupta. In this tradition, Shakti is described as an energy inherent to the soul, which practitioners consider accessible regardless of religious background. Because of this perspective, Siddhayoga is sometimes viewed as having secular aspects rather than being exclusively Hindu in a sectarian sense.

== Scriptural sources ==
The teachings of Siddhayoga focus on the development of qualities such as peace, creativity, and spiritual energy. The guru is considered to play a significant role in facilitating this transformation of the disciple. The Yoga Vani is considered a significant scripture guiding practitioners on the path of Siddhayoga.

A Siddhayoga guru is believed to possess the kundalini shakti, which radiates from the master to the disciple at the Muladhara Chakra. This process awakens and raises spiritual energy up the Sushumna. Several classical texts within Yogic and Tantric traditions describe transformative effects attributed to proximity to a guru. The Kularnava Tantra states: "An intelligent person should regard this teacher as their preceptor, by whose contact inexpressible bliss is produced in the disciple." The Yoga Vasistha says: "A real preceptor can produce a blissful sensation in the body of the disciple by their sight, touch, or instructions."

Practitioners describe Siddhayoga as a focus on internal transformation and the realization of one's "true nature", regardless of specific external rites and rituals. The tradition characterizes it as an individual spiritual path (dharma) aligned with a person's specific inclinations and in balance with nature's rhythms. Traditional accounts describe these practices as being intended to promote mental tranquility and a sense of harmony.

== Siddhayoga Lineage ==
Sri Swami Shankar Purushottam Tirtha Maharaj

Swami Shankar Purushottam Tirtha (1888–1958) is described in tradition as associated with two monastic lineages. He was reportedly first initiated into Siddhayoga by Swami Narayana Dev Tirtha (born c. 1879), whose spiritual lineage was through Swami Gangadhara Tirtha. Swami Shankar Purushottam Tirtha later took sannyas under Swami Bharati Krishna Tirtha in Puri. During Swami Bharati Krishna Tirtha's visit to America, Swami Shankar Purushottam Tirtha was reportedly asked to maintain the seat of Shankaracharya of Puri Govardhan Mutt.

He traveled north to the Himalayas, a region traditionally associated with yogic and ascetic practice. According to accounts, the King of Tehri Garhwal offered him a substantial plot of land along the Ganges River; however, he is said to have accepted only a small portion after multiple requests.

Shankar Math, an ashram located in Uttarkashi, was established in 1933. A second centre, "Siddhayogashram," was founded in Varanasi's Chhoti Gaibi in 1934. Swami Shankar Purushottam Tirtha wrote several books, including Yogavani, Japa Sadhana, and Guruvani, originally written in Bengali and later translated into Hindi. He also wrote a short treatise in English, titled Who Am I?

Swami Shankar Purushottam Tirtha was the guru of Swami Narayana Tirtha (d. 2001). Swami Vishnu Tirtha was another disciple, initiated in 1939. Swami Shivom Tirtha, a disciple of Swami Vishnu Tirtha, has a website providing further details on the Tirtha Siddhayoga lineage tree.

The Tirtha lineage of Swami Bharati Krishna Tirtha (1884–1960) traces itself back to Sri Adi Shankara. According to Guru-shishya tradition, the lineage began when Lord Narayana passed wisdom to Brahma, Brahma to Vasishtha, to Shakti, to Parashara, to Veda Vyasa, and to Shuka. This portion of the lineage is described as father to son. From Shuka, it was passed on from guru to shishya, to Patanjali, then to Gaudapada, Govinda, Chandra Sharma, and finally to Adi Shankara.

This succession is said to have begun the tradition of wandering monks. Vyasa reportedly told Govinda of the advent of Shiva incarnating as Adi Shankara, to meet and give him sanyas diksha. Shankara's stated purpose in incarnating was to comment on the Brahma Sutras. Shankaracharya is credited with establishing four monastic centres in the north, south, east, and west of India, traditionally regarded as significant institutions for religious guidance, and also with setting up the ten monastic orders: Tirtha, Ashrama, Vana, Aranya, Giri, Parvata, Sagara, Saraswati, Bharati, and Puri.

== Publications ==
Several books have been published in Bengali, Hindi, and English by Purushottam Publishers under the direction of Swami Atmananda Tirtha.
