= Subodhananda =

Swami Subodhananda স্বামী সুবোধানন্দ (Bengali)
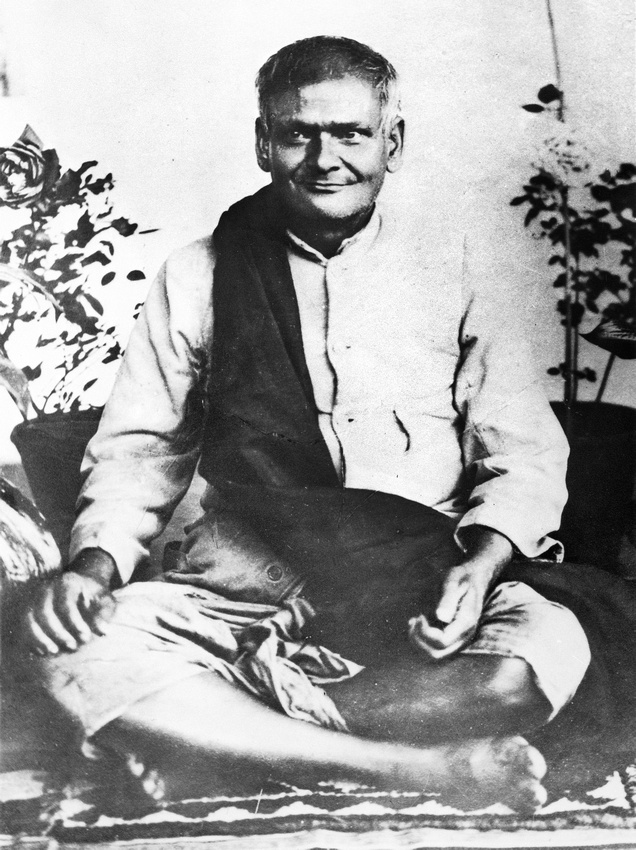
- Swami Subodhananda

Personal life
- Born: Subodh Chandra Ghosh; 8 November 1867 Calcutta, Bengal Presidency, British India
- Died: 2 December 1932 (aged 65) Calcutta, Bengal Presidency, British India

Religious life
- Religion: Hinduism
- Philosophy: Advaita Vedanta

Religious career
- Teacher: Ramakrishna

Quotation

"Do you expect anything when you present some gifts to your little brothers and sisters? One should love God like that. Say: “Master, I offer my body and mind, my life, and everything to you. Give me shelter at your blessed feet. I don’t want anything else.”

Subodhananda (8 November 1867 – 2 December 1932), born as Subodh Chandra Ghosh, was a direct monastic disciple of Ramakrishna, the 19th-century saint and mystic from India. The youngest of the direct monastic disciples, he was affectionately known by his brother monks, whose leader was Swami Vivekananda, as "Khoka" (Bengali for little boy). He played a pioneering role in establishing the Ramakrishna Math and the Ramakrishna Mission. He was one of the first group of trustees of the Belur Math appointed by Vivekananda in 1901, and was afterwards elected treasurer of the Ramakrishna Mission.

== Biography ==
=== Early years ===
Subodh Chandra Ghosh was born in Calcutta on 8 November 1867 to the family of Shankar Ghosh, who was also the founder of a famous landmark in Calcutta, the Kali temple in Thanthania in the north. He was thus born in a well-to-do family in a religious environment conducive to the enquiry beyond material realm. As per the prevailing customs he was supposed to get married after passing his class examinations. However, apparently because of a disinclination to marry, he failed in the examination. Subodh was at first a student of the Hare School and was then admitted into the school founded by Ishwar Chandra Vidyasagar, a notable social reformer and educationist of Bengal in the 19th century.

While studying there, he came across a Bengali book called The Teachings of Sri Ramakrishna, by Suresh Chandra Datta. He was impressed and decided to meet Ramakrishna, who resided in Dakshineswar temple. He was received very cordially by the saint, who asked him to visit him on Tuesdays and Saturdays. Subodh came to him despite obstacles, raised by his parents. As part of his practices there under the tutelage of Ramakrishna, he was helped into deep meditation by the latter, which benefited him in his spiritual pursuits.

Subodhananda, when asked by Ramakrishna what he thought of him, replied that, "Many persons say many things about you, I would not believe them unless I myself find proof."

Ramakrishna advised him to visit Mahendranath Gupta, also known as "M", who later became famous as the author of Ramakrishna Kathamrita, the original Bengali version of The Gospel of Sri Ramakrishna.

=== Life of a monk ===
After the death of Ramakrishna in 1886, Subodh left his home and joined the monastery in Baranagar, started by Narendranath Dutta, who later became known as Vivekananda. Subodh's monastic name was Swami Subodhananda, but he was more popularly called "Khoka" or the child, being the youngest among the brother disciples. Towards the end of 1889, along with Brahmananda, Subodhananda went to Benaras where he practised austerities. In 1890, they together went for a pilgrimage to the Western and Central India including Omkar, Girnar, Bombay, Dwarka and to Vrindaban where they stayed for some time. He also went to the Himalayas for spiritual quest, went as far as Kedarnath and Badrinath. He also travelled to South India as far as Cape Comorin or Kanya Kumari.

After Vivekananda returned from the West, he exhorted the brother disciples to work for the welfare of the humanity, Subodhananda pledged his service and was put under various capacities for the cause of the newly founded Ramakrishna Math and Ramakrishna Mission. He was initially placed in charge of the management of the monastery in 1899. When the great plague broke out in Calcutta, Subodhananda worked hard for arranging relief and rehabilitation along with Sadananda and Sister Nivedita.

During the famine of 1908 in the Chilka islands of Orissa he worked alongside fellow monks of the Ramakrishna Mission to provide relief to the affected people.

In his later years, even though he was not able to get engaged in active work, he would inspire people to work for the cause of welfare. During the last years he made extensive tours of Bengal and Bihar to spread the message of Ramakrishna and Vivekananda. He initiated a large number of people, including children. In making disciples he made no distinction in terms of social position, caste, sex or age.

Subodhananda was one of the first group of trustees of the Belur Math appointed by Vivekananda, and was later appointed as the treasurer.

=== Character and legacy ===
One of the hallmarks of Subodhananda's character was frankness. When Ramakrishna had asked him to interact with "M", he responded that the latter being a householder would not be able to teach him about God. When young Subodh went to meet "M" he narrated this conversation verbatim to "M" who appreciated his openness.

He also would be found near sick beds nursing people, often at risk to his own health. One of such instances was his nursing of a young student who was suffering from a contagious and malignant type of smallpox. He would beg money from others to help poor patients with diet and medicine. He helped many poor families with the money donated by devotees for his personal needs.

He was self-reliant and did not accept personal service from others, even during his illness. He had very few things as personal belongings. In personal conduct as well as in conversation, he put much emphasis on self-surrender to God as the means of salvation.

One of his famous lectures was in Madras in 1897 to an audience belonging to the Young Men's Hindu Association, where he talked on Sannyasa (renunciation) and Brahmacharya (celibacy).

=== Relationship with monks and brother disciples ===
Subodhananda was an ardent follower of Vivekananda, and the latter loved him as well. He was childlike in his simplicity and unassuming in his behaviour. For this reason was loved and respected by his brother disciples. On an occasion in 1897 he was persuaded by Vivekananda to deliver a lecture in the Alambazar monastery, despite his inhibitions with public speaking. When he rose to speak, tremors were felt on account of an earthquake. Vivekananda then quipped that "Khoka's was an earth-shattering speech" and everybody enjoyed at his expense.

Subodhananda was addicted lifelong to his morning cup of tea and when Ramakrishna was ill in his Cossipore garden house, the young Subodh prescribed tea as a remedy for his sore throat. However, it was rejected by the attending doctor. He would also guide and mentor them in performing their day to activities and in other spiritual matters.
