= Janakananda Saraswati =

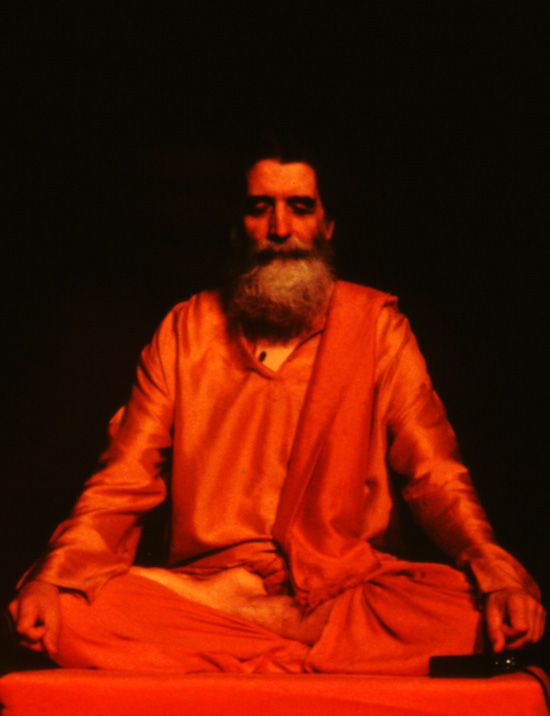
- Janakananda at the National Yoga Conference in Aix-les-Bains, France, 1995

Personal life
- Born: Jørgen Dreiager; June 13, 1939 (age 87) Copenhagen, Denmark
- Notable work(s): Yoga, Tantra and Meditation in Daily Life

Religious life
- Religion: Hinduism
- Philosophy: Tantra, Kriya Yoga

Religious career
- Teacher: Satyananda Saraswati

Quotation

Whatever you experience, you acknowledge and use in the process of realisation, rather than avoiding it through control and restraint. This approach is of fundamental importance in Tantra – in its practices, rituals and meditations. It is not a question of taking severe measures, but of being aware and present in what is anyway done, thought and experienced. In a devoted and yet neutral way you let happen what happens, without reacting or struggling against it – and without giving up or letting yourself be overwhelmed by or dependent upon anything.

Swami Janakananda Saraswati is a tantric yoga and meditation teacher and a writer, who has had a noted influence in the dissemination of yoga and meditation in Scandinavia and Northern Europe. He is the oldest active sannyasin disciple of Satyananda Saraswati in Europe.

== Early life ==
Born Jørgen Dreiager on 13 June 1939 in Copenhagen, Denmark he was introduced to yoga by his medical doctor as a child and continued to practise as a teenager and while in his twenties. From 1962 to 1965 he was part of a professional pantomime group, in which he learned through intensive practice how to use physical yoga as a means for creative expression and concentration.

In 1968 he met his teacher Satyananda Saraswati, who initiated him into Kriya Yoga and other advanced tantric practices. For two years he lived with Satyananda in his ashram in Bihar, India, and for several months traveled with him throughout the country.

== Scandinavian Yoga and Meditation School ==
In 1970 Janakananda returned to Denmark, where he founded the Scandinavian Yoga and Meditation School, Copenhagen's first yoga school. The Scandinavian Yoga and Meditation School grew quickly and expanded to 12 independent branches in Denmark, Sweden, Finland, Norway, Germany and France. It is today Scandinavia's largest yoga school and a well-known institution of the Satyananda Yoga tradition in Europe, training thousands of students each year in classical yoga and meditation.

== Teaching ==
For the past four decades, Janakananda has been active in Northern Europe, teaching in Håå Course Center, Småland, Sweden or one of the independent branches of the Scandinavian Yoga and Meditation School. He was a resident and guest teacher at the Ananda Ashram in New York through the 1980s and again in 2006, and has travelled extensively, teaching meditation, giving lectures and participating in conferences in Sydney, Singapore, Bogota, Buenos Aires, London, and several other locations around the world.

In 1971 Janakananda was one of the first in Europe to teach the full Kriya Yoga sequence of 22 kriyas, during a period of 21 or 33 days of silence, and he has done so ever since, twice a year, in retreats at Håå Course Center. Janakananda maintains that, according to the tradition, and his own teacher, Kriya Yoga should only be taught under the special conditions of an ashram, during a period of strict silence.

In the early 1970s, Janakananda advanced teaching tantric sexual rituals. But, faced with criticism in the media and society in general, he discontinued the teaching of this practice in favor of the more deep-reaching methods of tantra. Nevertheless, he has had "a profound, and often unacknowledged influence on many Western Neo-Tantric teachers and practitioners of sacred sexuality".

He is also a teacher of the deep relaxation Yoga Nidra technique. In 1977, Janakananda organized "Meditation Yoga 77", an international yoga congress held in Stockholm and attended by an eclectic list of speakers, reflecting the many Indian teachers who would visit the Scandinavian Yoga and Meditation School in succeeding years.

Janakananda uses various mediums in his teaching. These have included art, technology and science. Janakananda was a close friend and associate of the tantric poet and painter Sohan Qadri. For many years, they worked together on promoting the tantric practice of yantra meditation in the West. Janakananda is prominently featured on The Seer, a short film about the life and art of Sohan Qadri.

Janakananda has collaborated in scientific research into yoga with the University of Cologne, the Karolinska Institute in Stockholm, The Kennedy Institute in Copenhagen, among others. He has also facilitated a deep-reaching study into Kriya Yoga's effect in the brain, performed by neuroscientist Erik Hoffmann; this was published in Bindu, a yoga magazine which is among several publications for which Janakananda writes. He has also written a book, Yoga, Tantra and Meditation in Daily Life has been published in nine languages.

During the 2009 and 2010 concert seasons, Janakananda was invited by Danish Radio to guide the tantric meditation "Returning" to a national radio audience.

== Bibliography ==
- Saraswati, Swami Janakananda (16 November 2015). Yoga, Tantra and Meditation in Daily Life (EU/UK ed.). Bindu Publishers. ISBN 978-9197789455.
- Experience Yoga Nidra - Guided deep relaxations on CD by Swami Janakananda ISBN 91-630-9488-6
- Satyananda, Paramhansa; Hansen, Lilly; Saraswati, Janakananda (1979). Hatha Yoga. Guni Martin. ISBN 978-87-87412-12-4.
