= Vishwadevanand Puri =

Hindu monk and a traditional teacher (1946 - 2013)

Swami Vishwadevanand Puri
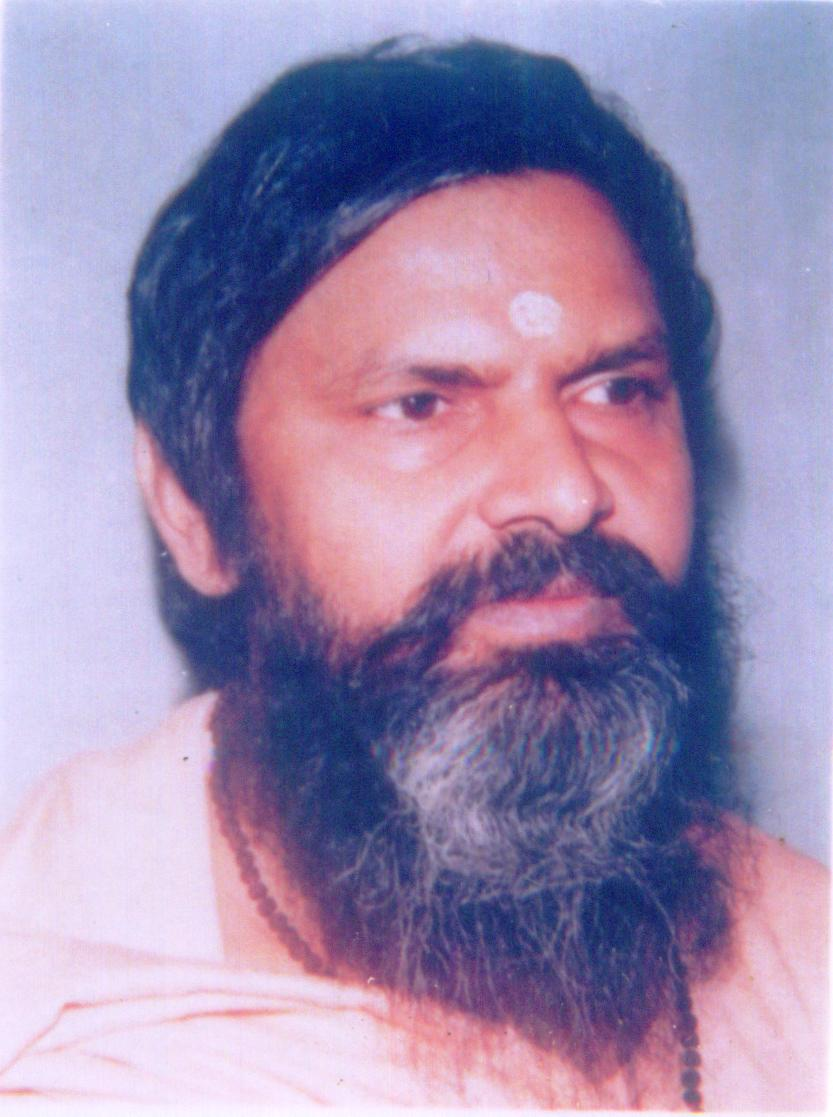

Personal life
- Born: Kailash Nath Shukla; 26 January 1946 Naugawan district of Kanpur division, India
- Died: 7 May 2013 (aged 67) Haridwar, Uttarakhand, India
- Honors: Nirvan Pithadhishwar Acharya Mahamandleshwar

Religious life
- Religion: Hinduism
- Philosophy: Advaita Vedanta

Religious career
- Disciples: Anantbodh Chaitanya

Swami Vishwadevanand Puri (26 January 1946 – 7 May 2013) was a Hindu monk and a traditional teacher of Advaita Vedanta. He founded the Vishwakalyan Foundation Trust (Shri Yantra Mandir) in Haridwar.

== Early life ==
Puri was born Kailash Nath Shukla in the village of Naugawan, Kanpur division, Uttar Pradesh on 26 January 1946 to Vishwanath Shukla. As a child, he had a great interest in spirituality and religion. Puri read many Vedic scriptures, which made him resolve to lead a Sanyasi's life for the welfare of mankind. When he was sixteen, he left home permanently in search of God and cut ties with his family. While traveling, he sought out the Sanyasi Pujya Swami Sadananda Paramhansa in Dariyapur village. Puri wanted to learn Satsang. Under Sadananda's guidance, he became proficient in many types of sadhanas.

Puri's interest in Vedic philosophy grew and he became interested in Vedanta. He had an initiation ritual with Param Tapasvi Anant Shri Vibhushit Acharya Mahamandaleshwar Nirvana Pithadhishvar Swami Atulanand Ji in 1962 and became a paramahamsa, the highest level of spiritual education in Hinduism, which is considered by believers to make a person one with ultimate reality. Puri, renamed Paramahamsa Parivrajaka Acharya Swami Vishwadevanand Ji Maharaj, went on a pilgrimage to holy sites throughout India to understand the plight of the people and find viable solutions to dispel ignorance. Probably his last household deciple was Pradeep Mishra author of From Leader To Creator. He went on a later world tour to share his knowledge with people worldwide. Supported by his Vedic knowledge and spiritual experiences, he developed a vision to serve society based on the principle of Vasudev Kutumbakam: "the whole world is one family of the divine". He founded the Vishwa Kalyan Foundation in Haridwar.

== Education ==
With the permission of Swami Aulanand Ji Maharaj, Puri studied at the ashram in Ellis Bridge, Ahmedabad. He studied the systems of Nyaya, Bhagwat and Vedanta, and grammar and philosophy with Param Guru Acharya Mahamandaleshwar Nirvana Pithadhishvar Swami Krishnanand Ji Maharaj Shri.

== Mahanirvani Akhada ==
An organization of sadhus, the Shri Panchayati Akhara Mahanirvani, honored Puri in 1985 at the Haridwar Kumbh Mela. He was then elected Acharya Mahamandaleshwar (leader) of the Shri Panchayati Akhara Mahanirvan). As leader of the akhara, he chaired ashrams in Haridwar, Varanasi, Kolkata, and Ahmedabad. Puri established the world's first stone Shri Yantra temple in Kankhal, Haridwar, Uttarakhand. His best-known disciple is Anantbodh Chaitanya from Panipat, Haryana, who was initiated on 13 April 2005 at the Sanyas ashram. Puri appointed Australian swami Jasraj Puri as a mahamandaleshwar in the Mahanirvani Akhada.

Aastha TV produced a documentary about Puri. He has initiated many Nagas at the Mahanirvani Akhada as an acharya. Brahamlin Swami Martand Puri received diksha from Puri, and was appointed a mahamandaleshwar by him. Swami Nityanand was also appointed a mahamandleshwar by Puri.

== Activities ==
Puri delivered religious discourses for thirty years. He attracted large audiences in India, and toured outside the country. Puri's lectures covered the Vedas, Upanishads, Bhagavatam, Puranas, Bhagavad Gita, Ramayana and other Eastern and Western philosophies, and he quoted the scriptures of other religions. He taught a simple, straightforward way of God-realization which could be practiced by anyone. Puri was a member of the Vishva Hindu Parishad. Sangh Sanchalak Shri Sudrashan and Lal Krishna Advani visited Sanyas Ashram in Vile Parle and met Puri on Vijayadashami (31 October 2004) to premiere a film based on K. B. Hedgewar's life. Puri supported Ram Setu and Ram Mandir. RSS chief Mohan Bhagwat visited Sanyas Ashram and met Puri. "He spent nearly 45 minutes here. We discussed religious affairs and ancient Indian traditions as well as issues like terrorism", Puri said.

== Views on religious freedom ==
Puri was a proponent of freedom of religion, saying that "religious harmony is closely dependent on the freedom each religion grants to the other."

== Death ==
Puji died in Haridwar on 7 May 2013 after a car accident while he was returning to his ashram from Jolly Grant Airport in Dehradun.
