= Swami Adidevananda =

Indian monk of the Ramakrishna Mission

- Born: 1912; Mysore
- Died: 1983 (aged 70–71)
- Occupations: Monk; Writer

Swami Adidevananda (1912–1983) was an Indian monk of the Ramakrishna Mission.

== Life ==
He was born as Venkatapathi in 1912 in the erstwhile Mysore State. He began his monastic life at the Madras centre of Ramakrishna Math in 1934. He looked after the publication department of the centre for 6 years. He received initiation from Swami Vijnanananda. He received sanyasa from Swami Virajananda, the 6th President of the Order, in 1942. After working at the Varanasi Sevashrama for about 7 years. He then posted at the centre in Vishakhapattanam in October 1947. He assumed the charge as the manager of the Madras centre in November 1948. Thereafter he took charge of the Math centre at Mangalore and was mainly responsible for its growth. The ashrama with its orphanage and a charitable dispensary, flourished under his care.

He was elected a trustee of Ramakrishna Math and member of Governing body of Mission in December 1965. He was the treasurer of organisation for some years. He was at headquarters of Ramakrishna Math, Belur till 1970. He became president of centre at Basavanagudi in Bangalore. He died on 14 June 1983 at the age of 71.

== Works ==
During his 17 years of spiritual ministration at Mangalore, he translated into Kannada many of Sanskrit scriptures. His literary contributions comprise the following works:

=== Kannada works ===
1. Bhagavad Gita
2. Eleven Major Upanishads
3. Upanishattugala Sara-sangraha : Gist of the Upanishads
4. Brahmasutras
5. Patanjala Yoga-darshana : Yogasutras of Patanjali - along with commentary by Vyasa
6. Shree Lalita Sahasranama : Thousand names of Shri Lalitha
7. Shree Lalita Threeshati stotra : Three hundred hymns to Shri Lalitha
8. Viveka Chudamani of Shankaracharya
9. Panchadashi of Vidyaranya

=== English Works ===
1. Brahmasutras with Ramanuja Bhashya (co-authored with Swami Vireswarananda)
2. Bhagavad Gita with Bhashya of Sri Ramanuja
3. Yatindra-mata-deepika
4. Stotra-ratna of Yamunacharya
