= Pranavananda Saraswathi =

Sri lankan guru (1908–1982)

Pranavānanda Saraswati
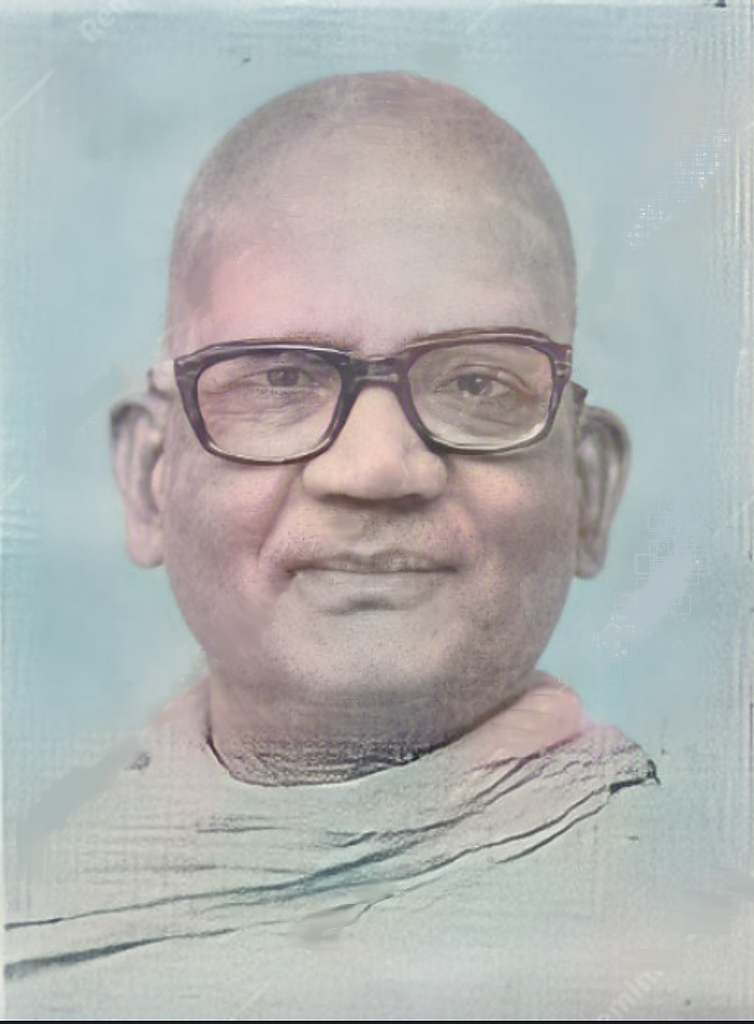

Personal life
- Born: N. Ponniah; 28 August 1908 Alavaddi, Sri Lanka
- Died: 28 August 1982 (aged 74) Batu Caves, Malaysia
- Honors: Gurubakthi Ratna, Prachara Praveena,

Religious life
- Religion: Hinduism
- Philosophy: Yoga of Synthesis

Religious career
- Teacher: Sivananda Saraswati

Pranavānanda Saraswati (Swami Pranavananda; 28 August 1908 – 28 August 1982) known previously as N. Ponniah was a founding member of the Divine Life Society in Malaysia.

== Early life ==
N. Ponniah was born on 28 August 1908 at Alavaddi, in Sri Lanka. His parents Nagamuthu and Kannagi were devout Hindus. He studied at Arunodaya College. His college Principal T. Sinnathamby was a great influence. He came into contact with Yogaswami, through the help and guidance of K. Satkunasingam - who was later known as Siva Sathar - who showed him the Yoga Marg.

== Service in Malaysia ==
In 1925 Ponniah went to Malaya and joined the Railway Department. Thereafter he took up employment with the Rubber Research Institute of Malaya served for more than 35 years, rising to Administrative Assistant by the time he retired in 1963. He identified with the activities of Vivekananda Ashrama, Brahma Gyana Sabah, Arul-Neri Thirukkuttam, Theiva-Neri Kazhakam, The Theosophical Society, Hindu Prachar Sabha, Pure Life Society, especially during their formative years.

== Blessings of the sages ==
Ponniah undertook his first pilgrimage to India in 1948, and had darshan and blessings of Bhagawan Ramana Maharshi, Sri Aurobindo, and Kavi Yogi Sudhananda Bharatiar. He received during his later pilgrimages the benedictions of Ramadas, Paramahamsa Nityananda, Gnanananda Giri and Ananda Mai Ma. Yogi Sudhananda Bharatiar adopted him as his godson and taught him yoga asanas and sadhanas. When Yogi Sudhananda Bharatiar started the Sudha Samajam at Kuala Lumpur Ponniah was his handyman.

== Guru ==
About 1950 he started his association with the Divine Life Society. In 1952 a copy of the Divine Life from Sivananda Ashram, Rishikesh reached Ponniah and he wrote his first letter to Sivananda Saraswati on 1 October 1952. Finally in 1953, Ponniah was drawn to Rishikesh and had darshan of Sivananda. While he was in Rishikesh in 1959, Sivananda made him a Committee Member of Divine Life Society Headquarters at Rishikesh and conferred upon him the title of 'Gurubakthi Ratna', and 'Prachara Praveena'. Ponniah became the founder member of Divine Life Society, Kuala Lumpur. He was given conditional initiation into sannyas by Sivananda in this year and was named Pranavānanda Saraswati. Sivananda's letters and advice to Pranavananda have come out in the form of a book titled Elixir Divine.

In 1964, when Pranavānanda was at Rishikesh, the President of Divine Life Society, Chidananda Maharaj, accepted him fully in the fold of sannyasins with viraja homam in front of Gurudev's Samadhi, and acclaimed him Pranavānanda Saraswati on the sacred Guru Purnima Day (24 July 1964).

He founded the Sivananda Ashram on 3 acres (12,000 m^{2}) of land at the foot of the Holy Batu Caves (a miniature Rishikesh), and became its president. He practised brahmacharya (celibacy) and tapas. The ashram became a centre of pilgrimage in Malaysia. Today, Divine Life Society has 20 branches in Malaysia, twelve set up by mainly by Pranavānanda.

== World Tour ==
In August 1969 Vishnudevananda Saraswati, Founder Director of the Sivananda Yoga Vedanta Centre, Montreal, Canada invited Pranavānanda to the Yoga World Brotherhood. This opportunity afforded him "viswa parikramana" - going round the globe - expounding the teachings of Gurudev. The countries he visited included Hong Kong, Japan, Hawaii, United States, England France, Belgium, Germany, Switzerland, Italy, Greece, Egypt, India and Sri Lanka. While in Europe he participated in the International Yoga Conference held at Brussels by the Belgian Yoga Federation. On 15 November 1969 Pranavānanda had an audience with Pope Paul VI at the Vatican.

== Other organizations ==
Pranavānanda's also did work for other organizations. He was Malaysian delegate at the World Hindu Religious Convention held at New Delhi (1965); Patron of the Malaysian Hindu Youth Council which directs 50 Hindu Youth Organisations. He was Patron of the eighth Hindu Youth Convention held in Kuala Lumpur (1967); Spiritual Adviser to the Malaysia Hindu Sangam - he was Conference Chairman of the First, Second and Third Malaysian Hindu Conferences (December 1968, April 1970, December 1975). He was Director of Studies for 8 courses of training in Hinduism for Tamil Teachers and others from 19 onwards; Malaysian delegate to the World Conference on Religion Philosophy and Culture held at Madurai, South India, sponsored by H. H. Jagadguru Sri Sankaracharya of Sri Kanchi Kamakodi Peeta 1977.

== Publications ==
Pranavānanda was instrumental in the publication of Divine Messenger, a periodical about Sivananda Saraswati and saints, sages and prophets.

Pranavananda compiled and published the book of common prayer entitled Bhajananjali for the use of the spiritual seekers in Malaysia. The first edition was released in September 1967.
