= Swami Maheshwarananda =

Indian guru (born 1945)

Paramhans Swami Maheshwarananda

Personal life
- Born: Mangilal Garg; 15 August 1945 (age 81) Rupawas, Pali district Rajasthan, India
- Honors: Vishwaguru, Jagadguru, Mahamandaleshwar, Paramhansa, Dharma Chakravarti

Religious life
- Religion: Hinduism
- Philosophy: Vedanta, Sanatana Dharma

Religious career
- Teacher: Swami Madhavanandaji

Swami Maheshwarananda (born Mangilal Garg 15 August 1945), known as Swamiji, is an Indian yogi and guru.

== Youth ==
Mangilal Garg was born on born 15 August 1945 in Rupawas, Pali district, Rajasthan, India, to pandit and astrologer Krishna Ramji Garg and Phul Devi Garg. Inspired by his parents, he started to learn to meditate when he was three years old and soon spent most of his time in prayer and meditation. He grew up with two brothers and three sisters. His father died when he was twelve and his mother sent him to meet his uncle, Swami Madhavananda, at the age of 13 in Nipal. Mangilal showed little interest in schoolwork, but constantly asked his uncle to make him a sannyasi.

A few years later, Madhavananda prescribed Mangilal strict yogic exercises and in 1962, after six months of fasting and meditation, he attained the state of self-realisation. He was initiated in the order of swamis in 1967. In 1972, he went to Europe and founded the Austrian-Indian Yoga-Vedanta fellowship in Vienna and the first Sri Deep Madhavananda Ashram.

== Guru lineage ==
The guru lineage of Swami Maheshwarananda begins with Sri Alakh Puriji. He was the Guru of Sri Devpuriji, whose disciplines believed him to be an incarnation of Shiva. He lived sometime in the 19-20th century in an ashram in the village of Kachras in Rajasthan, India.

His spiritual successor was Sri Mahaprabhuji (1828-1963). As Sri Devpuriji, he also announced his departure and died in meditation posture after singing OM in the presence of his disciples. Sri Mahaprabhuji was believed to be an incarnation of Vishnu by his disciples and was thought to possess all 24 siddhis. He spent much of his life in an ashram close to Bari Kathu in Rajasthan.

Sri Mahaprabhuji received the title of Paramhansa from Sri Shankaracharya of Shringhari Matha in Pushkar in the presence of Sri Shankaracharya of Puri.

Paramhans Swami Madhavananda spent on the side of Mahaprabhuji more than 20 years and with his permission wrote a book titled Lila Amrit about the lives of Sri Mahaprabhuji and Sri Devpuriji describing the many miracles they performed. Swami Madhavananda named Paramhans Swami Maheshwarananda as his spiritual successor and died in 2003.

== Teachings ==
The main points of Maheshwarananda's teachings are physical, mental, social and spiritual health; respect for life; tolerance for all religions, cultures and nationalities; world peace; protection of human rights and values; protection of the environment and preservation of nature; selfless service, and care and love for all living things. According to his teachings, the realisation of these fundamental principles of life will lead man to spiritual development, self-realisation, and realisation of God. According to him, Yoga is not a part of any religion, but all religions are part of Yoga, because Yoga is universal. Furthermore, he teaches Yoga is a religion in terms of relation between individual and cosmic self, that is, God.

"Yoga in Daily Life, the System" is a holistic and comprehensive system concerning body, mind, consciousness and soul. The system combines religion and exercise, with yogic exercises ("psychosomatic movements") adapted to the individual. The system was developed with doctors, therapists and psychologists and is designed as a complete system in the yoga tradition, including all the main yoga paths:

- the path of the selfless way of acting (Karma Yoga)
- the path of discipline and meditation (Raja Yoga)
- the path of devotion (Bhakti Yoga)
- the path of realisation and knowledge (Jnana Yoga)
- purification techniques (Hatha Yoga)

The system was developed and organised into eight levels by Swami Maheshwarananda. The goal of "Yoga in Daily Life, the System" is to create a program in which people can learn human responsibility towards the world and environment in which we are living; foster our compassion for all living beings; develop dormant hidden forces, and learn how to use them for the benefit of the world. The system can be lived and practised independently of age, social status, nationality and denomination. The system is an acknowledged diplomatic course in overseas (European) universities, and is taught in schools and hospitals for physical rehabilitation.

Swamiji's books are published in 11 languages and thousands of non-profit centres of Yoga in Daily life are present in all five continents.

== Organisation of work ==
The International Sri Deep Madhavananda Ashram Fellowship is a non-profit and non-denominational organisation seated in Vienna/Austria, at Schikanedergasse 12/13 (A-1040 Vienna). It was founded in 1990 by Paramhans Swami Maheshwarananda to unite, under one organisation, the various associations of "Yoga in daily life" that are scattered across the world. The fellowship has a member association in Roster Consultative Status with the Economic and Social Council of the United Nations (ECOSOC).

In 1990, Paramhans Swami Maheshwarananda also laid the foundation stone of a project referred to as Om Ashram with the full name Om Vishwa Deep Gurukul, Swami Maheshwarananda Education & Research Center. The center is located on 250 acres (1.0 km^{2}) in the Jadan district of Rajasthan in the form of ancient symbol OM. Once completed, it would be the largest man-made symbol of OM in the world. Since 2003, the Om Ashram is also the Mahasamadhi Shrine (tomb) of his guru Dharmasamrat Paramhans Swami Madhavananda.

Another his initiative is the Sri Swami Madhavananda World Peace Council which has been established as a non-governmental, humanitarian and charitable society. The feature event of the Sri Madhavananda World Peace Council is the "World Peace Summit" (WPS) which met for several years in different countries with the aim to discuss a special topic (religious dialogue, humanitarian projects,... ) to support world peace. The events brought together a large gathering of politicians, scientists and general public.

Swami Maheshwaranandaji "Save the Birds" initiative seeks to bring broader attention to the problem of birds being endangered.

== Humanitarian projects ==
- In 2002, the Shree Vishwa Deep Gurukul Prathmik Vidyalaya, Yoga in Daily Life's primary school in Rajasthan, India, was founded.
- To address the major water crisis in the desert state of Rajasthan, India, the International Sri Deep Madhavananda Ashram Fellowship, has launched a Desert Rainwater Harvesting initiative.
- Healthcare. The "Sri Swami Madhavananda Hospital" at Jadan Ashram in the Pali district of Rajasthan, India, serves as a naturopathic and allopathic hospital since there is no other professional hospital in the 30 km area of the Ashram. This will provide residential health care to neighbouring districts.

== Recognitions and awards ==
- Representative at the Millennium World Peace Conference of Religious and Spiritual Leaders at the UN-Headquarter, New York, 2000.
- Award with the Danica Order, the highest decoration for humanitarian merits, by the President of the Republic Croatia, Stjepan Mesic, October 2002.
- Bharat Gaurav, Lifetime Achievement Award in 2014. One of the Highest Awards in India.

== Bibliography ==
- Yoga in Daily Life – The System. Austria: Iberia/European University Press. 2000. ISBN 3-85052-000-5.
  - Spanish (ISBN 3-85052-007-2)
  - German (ISBN 3-85052-009-9)
  - French (ISBN 3-85052-010-2)
  - Hungarian (ISBN 3-85052-001-3)
  - Slovak (ISBN 3-85052-002-1)
  - Czech (ISBN 3-85052-003-X)
  - Croatian (ISBN 3-85052-004-8)
  - Serbian (ISBN 3-85052-005-6)
  - Slovene (ISBN 3-85052-006-4
- The Hidden Power in Humans – Chakras and Kundalini. Austria: Iberia/European University Press. 2002. ISBN 3-85052-197-4.
  - Russian (ISBN 978-5399001449)
- A Bright future through yoga.
  - Promoted by the Ministry of Health of Rajasthan, India
- Meetings with a Yogi. Delhi: B. R. Publishing Corporation. 1994. ISBN 81-7018-795-8.
- Diabetes, Help through Yoga in Daily Life. Austria: Iberia/European University Press. 2007. ISBN 978-3-85052-225-0.
- Healthy Heart through Yoga in Daily Life. Austria: Iberia/European University Press. 2004. ISBN 3-85052-155-9.
- High Blood-Pressure, Help through Yoga in Daily Life, Publ. by Iberia/European University Press, Austria, 2000, ISBN 3-85052-156-7
- Yoga Against Backache, Publ. by Maudrich, Germany, 1998, ISBN 3-442-10476-9
- Yoga for Joints, Publ. by Ehrenwirth, Germany, 1993, ISBN 3-431-03288-5
- Yoga with Children, Publ. by Hugendubel, Germany, 1990, ISBN 3-88034-492-2
- Patanjali's Yoga Sutras – Samadhi Path. Int.Sri Deep Madhavananda Ashram Fellowship.
  - Available in 6 languages.
- Selected Pearls. Int.Sri Deep Madhavananda Ashram Fellowship.
