= Swami Ghanananda (Ramakrishna Mission) =

Hindu monk

Swami Ghanananda (1898 - 1969) was a monk of Ramakrishna Mission, who went to Europe to spread the message of Vedanta. He started the Vedanta Centre in London in November 1948. Until 1969 he guided its affairs, established its monastery; edited the publications and also spoke in many parts of the country.

== Related links ==
- Vedanta Centre of UK
- Sri Ramakrishna and His Unique Message - Swami Ghanananda ISBN 0-902479-00-8
- Women Saints of East and West - Swami Ghanananda & John Steward-Wallace ISBN 0-87481-036-1
