= Yogamaharishi Swami Gitananda =

Yogamaharishi Swami Gitananda Giri (24 July 1907 – 27 December 1993), also known as Yogamaharishi Dr. Swami Gitananda Giri Guru Maharaj, was an Indian yogi, physician, writer, and teacher of yoga.

== Early life ==
Born in Maharajganj in northern India to a Sindhi father and an Irish mother, His father, Sukhraj Bhavanani, was a High court Advocate in the Patna High Court and an extensive landowner. His mother Leelavathi was converted to Hinduism through the Arya Samaj rites. Yogamaharishi received his early schooling at home from his mother. His mother died when he was eight years of age. When he was ten years, his Guru, Yogamaharishi Swami Kanakananda Bhrigu, (Ram Gopal Majumdar) entered his life. For six years, he studied in the Guru Kula of his Master, imbibing not only the traditional education, but also Yoga, Tantra and Yantra.

When he was sixteen, his Guru sent him to England to study medicine. After receiving his medical degree, he entered the British Royal Navy to serve as a ship's doctor during World War II. He was injured during the war, and used the time recuperating to further his medical education. He then traveled to North and South America and settled in Canada and set up his practice there, also establishing Yoga schools and centres wherever he lived. He was one of the pioneers to introduce Yoga to the Western audiences in the early 1950s. He also hosted visiting Yoga Gurus and Swamijis at his centre in Vancouver. In addition to his medical practice, he traveled widely lecturing and teaching. He worked several years for the US Atomic Energy Commission in the United States and also took up assignments for World Health Organization in South America.

== Ananda Ashram ==
He returned to settle permanently in India in 1967 and established the ICYER Yoga center, widely known as Ananda Ashram in Lawspet, Pondicherry. In 1975 Srila Shri Shankaragiri Swamigal appointed Dr Swami Gitananda Giri as Madathiapathy of Sri Kambali Swamy Madam, which was then a dilapidated Samadhi site of around five acres in Thattanchavady near the Lawspet Ashram. Yogamaharishi Dr Swami Gitananda Giri undertook the renovation of the ancient Samadhi site with great enthusiasm and built what was acclaimed as the Shanti Niketan of South India and An ideal Guru Kula on the Madam lands. Thus Swamiji who was the representative of the North Indian Brighu lineage also became a representative of the Saiva Siddhanta Yoga Tradition of South India.

Pujya Swamiji became an active fighter for Hindu rights and leader of the Hindu community in addition to his many other numerous duties. He served as vice president of the All India Association of Maths and Ashrams under the presidency of Sri Jayendra Saraswathi Swamigal the senior Shankaracharya of the Kanchi Kamakoti Petam.

== Achievements ==
He wrote twenty-five books on the subjects of Yoga and made ten world tours and more than twenty All India tours. He was known as the Lion of Pondicherry.

Pujya Swamiji was Patron and President of many Yoga and Scientific Organisations World Wide. Notably he was Patron of the Indian Academy of Yoga with headquarters at the famous Banaras Hindu University. He was President of Vishwa Yoga Samaj, a World Wide Organisation of Yogis, and Vice President of the All India Association of Madathiapathis. He was also the Governor-General for Yoga (1992–1995) in the World development Parliament (Vishwa Unnayan Samsad) with headquarters in West Bengal, India. He trained many students in Rishiculture Ashtanga (Gitananda) Yoga. His students have established more than 135 centres of Yoga in 30 countries around the world.

He received many honors in his lifetime. He was chosen by the Ministry of Health, Government of India, New Delhi, as a Governing Body Member of the prestigious Central Council for Research in Yoga and Naturopathy in March 1986 and he held this post till his death in 1993. He was awarded YOGA SHIROMANI by the then President of India Sri Zail Singh at the World Yoga Conference held at the Asian Village, New Delhi in December 1986. The Vishwa Unnayan Samsad at New Delhi honoured him in 1992 with the title Father of Modern Yoga Science. Pujya Swamiji had himself organised five World Conferences in Pondicherry, attended by professional persons and Yogis from all over the world. He sponsored the first International Yoga Asana Competition in Pondicherry in 1989. Since then an International Yoga Competition has been held each year in various places in South America, India and Europe. He was one of the driving forces behind Yoga Sports. Due to his inspiration and support, the Government of Pondicherry instituted an annual International Yoga Festival from January 1993 in Pondicherry, which features lectures by eminent speakers, Yoga Asana Competitions, and Yogic cultural programmes etc. Due to his influence, the Government of Pondicherry has also instituted Yoga teaching in all Government schools from 1997.

Pujya Swamiji collaborated with many films makers in making educational films on Yoga, including the famous film MUDRAS by Rajiv Mehrotra. He also was the guiding spirit behind the immensely popular television series YOGA FOR YOUTH, directed by Yogacharini Meenakshi Devi Bhavanani which has been broadcast for several years from 1989 over Doordarshan, India's national television network.

Swamiji was a scientist and researcher and presented more than thirty papers on his scientific research into Yoga at various Conferences throughout India. He collaborated with scientists from leading institutes throughout the country including AIIMS in New Delhi, NIMHANS in Bangalore, DIPAS (Indian Defense Institute) in New Delhi and JIPMER in Pondicherry.

His work is carried on by his son and successor Yogacharya Dr Ananda Balayogi Bhavanani under the guidance of Ammaji Yogacharini Meenakshi Devi Bhavanani who is current Resident Acharya ICYER at Ananda Ashram.

== Publications ==
1. Yoga Life: Monthly Journal
2. Yoga: Step-By-Step
3. Yoga Samyama
4. Yoga Life Annual
5. Yoga World Wide Directory 1992
6. Siddhis and Riddhis
7. Yoga For Expectant Mothers And Others
8. Yoga:One Woman's View
9. Yoga and Sports
10. Surya Namaskar
11. Yantra
12. Tribute to a Great Guru
13. A Heart That Is Distant
14. Frankly Speaking
15. The Ashtanga Yoga of Patanjali
16. A Yogic Approach to Stress
17. Yoga and Modern Man
18. A Primer of Yoga Theory
19. Yoga: 1 to 10
20. Yoga For Breathing Disorders
21. Hatha Yoga of Gitananda Yoga (Tamil)
22. Gita Inspirations (Poetry & Short Articles By Swamiji)
23. Mudras
24. Thirukkural and Yoga
25. Yoga for Weight Loss
26. Chakras
27. Yoga For Health and Healing
28. Pranayama in Gitananda Tradition
29. Yoga and Wellness
30. Understanding the Yoga Darshan
31. Yoga for a Wholistic Personality
32. Yoga Chikitsa: The Application of Yoga as a Therapy
33. Saraswati's Pearls –Dialogues on the Yoga of Sound
34. Yoga Dristhi
