= Swami Hariharananda Aranya =

Personal life
- Born: 4 December 1869 Bengal, India
- Died: 19 April 1947 (aged 77) Madhupur, India
- Notable work: Yoga Philosophy of Patanjali with Bhasvati

Religious life
- Religion: Hinduism
- Founder of: Kapil Math
- Philosophy: Samkhya-yoga

Religious career
- Teacher: Swami Triloki Aranya
- Disciples: Swami Dharmamegha Aranya and Swami Samadhi Prakash Aranya

Swami Hariharananda Aranya (1869–1947) was a yogi, author, and founder of Kapil Math in Madhupur, India, which is the only monastery in the world that actively teaches and practices Samkhya philosophy. His book, Yoga Philosophy of Patanjali with Bhasvati, is considered to be one of the most authentic and authoritative classical Sanskrit commentaries on the Yoga Sutras. Hariharananda is also considered by some as one of the most important thinkers of early twentieth-century Bengal.

Hariharananda came from a wealthy Bengali family and after his scholastic education renounced wealth, position, and comfort in search of truth in his early life. The first part of his monastic life was spent in the Barabar Caves in Bihar, hollowed out of single granite boulders bearing the inscriptions of Emperor Ashoka and very far removed from human habitation. He then spent some years at Tribeni, in Bengal, at a small hermitage on the bank of the Ganges and several years at Haridwar, Rishikesh, and Kurseong.

His last years were spent at Madhupur in Bihar, where according to tradition, Hariharananda entered an artificial cave at Kapil Math on 14 May 1926 and remained there in study and meditation for the last 21 years of his life. The only means of contact between him and his disciples was through a window opening. While living as a hermit, Hariharananda wrote numerous philosophical treatises. Some of Hariharananda's interpretations of Patañjali's Yoga system had elements in common with Buddhist mindfulness meditation.

== Works ==
1. A Unique Travelogue
2. Divine Hymns with Supreme Devotional Aphorisms
3. Progressive and Practical Samkhya-Yoga
4. Samkhya Across The Millenniums
5. The Doctrine of Karma
6. The Samkhya Catechism
7. Yogakarika
8. Yoga Philosophy of Patanjali with Bhasvati (1963)

See further bibliographical information on several works at WorldCat.
