= Advaita Guru Paramparā =

Traditional list historical teachers of Advaita Vedanta

The Advaita Guru-Paramparā ("Lineage of Gurus in Non-dualism") is the traditional lineage (parampara) of divine, Vedic and historical teachers of Advaita Vedanta. It begins with the Daiva-paramparā, the gods; followed by the Ṛṣi-paramparā, the Vedic seers; and then the Mānava-paramparā, with the historical teachers Gaudapada and Adi Shankara, and four of Shankara's pupils. Of the five contemporary acharyas, the heads of the five Advaita mathas, four acharyas trace their lineage to those four pupils and one to Adi Shankara himself.

From mediaeval times, Advaita Vedanta influenced other Indian religions as well, and since the 19th century it came to be regarded as the central philosophy of Indian religion. Several Neo-Vedanta movements and teachers, most notably the Ramakrishna Order, trace their roots to Advaita Vedanta, while the Inchegeri Sampradaya (Nisargadatta Maharaj) and Ramana Maharshi are popularly considered as Advaita Vedanta, though rooted in respectively the Nath and Tamil folk Saivite religion.

== Advaita Vedanta and paramparā ==
Advaita Vedanta is an Indian religious tradition of textual exegesis and yogic praxis, which states that the knowledge of the unity of Atman and Brahman is liberating. It is based on the textual exegesis of the Upanishads, the Brahma Sutras, and the Bhagavad Gita. It traces its roots back to Vedic times, as described in the Advaita Guru Paramparā, the Advaita version of the Guru–shishya tradition. Historically, Adi Shankara is regarded as its most influential teacher. This influence goes back to medieval times, when Advaita Vedanta came to be regarded as the central philosophy of the post-Vedic religions, and its philosophy influenced several Indian religious traditions.

In several Indian religious and philosophical traditions, all knowledge is traced back to the Gods and to the Rishis who saw the Vedas. The successive rishis and teachers of various Indian traditions are honoured in Guru-paramparās, lists of teachers in the Guru–shishya traditions.

== Deva, Rsi and Manav Paramparā ==
The current Acharyas, the heads of the four maṭhas set up by Adi Shankara, trace their authority back to the four main disciples of Shankara. Each of the heads of these four maṭhas takes the title of Shankaracharya ("the learned Shankara") after Adi Shankara. The Advaita guru-paramparā (Lineage of Gurus in Non-dualism) begins with the mythological time of the Daiva-paramparā, followed by the vedic seers of the Ṛṣi-paramparā, and the Mānava-paramparā of historical times and personalities: (Note: नारायणं पद्मभुवं वशिष्ठं शक्तिं च तत्पुत्रं पराशरं च व्यासं शुकं गौडपादं महान्तं गोविन्दयोगीन्द्रं अथास्य शिष्यम् । श्री शंकराचार्यं अथास्य पद्मपादं च हस्तामलकं च शिष्यम् तं तोटकं वार्त्तिककारमन्यान् अस्मद् गुरून् सन्ततमानतोऽस्मि ॥ nārāyanam padmabhuvam vasiṣtham śaktim ca tat-putram parāśaram ca vyāsam śukam gauḍapāda mahāntam govinda yogīndram athāsya śiṣyam śri śankarācāryam athāsya padmapādam ca hastāmalakam ca śiṣyam tam totakam vārtikakāramanyān asmad gurūn santatamānato’smi)

Traditional sloka lists the essential Advaita Guru parampara as follows:

Sada Shiva Samarambham
Sankaracharya Madhyamam
Asmat aacharya Paryantham
Vande Guru Paramparaa

Which translates as :

Beginning with lord Sadashiva,
With Sankaracharya in the middle,
And till my acharya,
I bow to the tradition of teachers

=== Daiva-paramparā ===
- Shiva
- Padmabhuva (Brahmā)

=== Ṛṣi-paramparā ===
- Vaśiṣṭha
- Śakti
- Parāśara
- Vyāsa (Note: the famous redactor of the vedas, he is also traditionally identified with Bādarāyaṇa, the composer of the Brahmasūtras)
- Śuka

=== Mānava-paramparā ===
- Gauḍapāda
- Govinda bhagavatpāda
- Śankara bhagavatpāda, and then Shankara's four disciples

- Padmapāda
- Hastāmalaka
- Toṭaka
- Vārtikakāra (Sureśvara) and others

=== Gurus in the four yugas ===
Each Yuga has its own gurus or Acharyas:

- In the Satya or Krata Yuga: Shiva and Lord Brahma.
- In the Treta Yuga: Vasishta Maharishi, Śakti Maharṣi and Parashara Maharishi.
- In the Dvapara Yuga: Veda Vyasa and Sri Shuka Acharya
- In the Kali Yuga: Sri Gaudapada Acharya, Govinda Bhagavatpadacharya, Shri Shankarāchārya, and the subsequent lineage.

=== Jagadgurus of the four Advaita Mathas ===
According to tradition, Sankara organised a section of the Ēkadaṇḍisannyāsins into the Vedic dashanami order, establishing four mathas in north, west, east, and south India, to facilitate the teaching of Advaita Vedanta, and maintain the dharma. He entrusted his four disciples to each of these four mathas. Some of the famous and current Mathadhipatis titled 'Sankaracharyas' are listed below:

- Sringeri Sharada Peetham
  - Sri Sacchidananda Shivabhinava Narasimha Bharathi Mahaswami (1865–1912); initiated many into Adi Shankaracharya's philosophy including Sacchidanandendra Saraswati- founder of Adhyatma Prakashana Karyalaya; known as "Abhinava Shankara" because of his many tours around Bharatvarsha spreading the Advaita Vedanta philosophy and Hindu Dharma
  - Sri Chandrashekhara Bharathi Mahaswami (1912–1954).
  - Sri Abhinavavidya Tirtha Mahaswamiji 1954–1989); A great Yogi and master of scriptures. In His many tours of Bharatvarsha and also Nepal He established many maths, shrines and temples.
  - Sri Bharathi Tirtha Mahaswami (1989- ); A sage and present Jagadguru of Shringeri Peetha, Sringeri, Karnataka.
  - Sri Vidhushekara Bharathi Mahaswami, Uttaradhikara (successor-designate).
- Jyotir Math
  - Swami Swaroopanand Saraswati
  - Swami Avimukteshwaranad Saraswati
- Govardhan Peetham
  - Swami Nishchalanand Saraswati
- Kalika Pitha
  - Swami Sadanand Saraswati
- Kanchi Kamakoti Peetam (Moolamnaya Sarvajya Peetam)
  - Pujyashree Chandrashekarendra Saraswati, 68th Acharya
  - Pujyashree Jayendra Saraswathi , 69th Acharya
  - Pujyashree Shankara Vijayendra Saraswati, 70th Acharya
  - Pujyashree Satya Chandrashekarendra Saraswati, 71st Acharya

== Acharyas known from literary sources ==
=== Ancient Acharyas ===
- Yajnavalkya: taught Brahmavidya to his wife Maitreyi, which is recorded in Brhadaranyaka Upanishad.
- Uddalaka: taught Brahmavidya to his son Svetaketu in Chandogya Upanishad.

=== Pre-Badarayana Acharyas ===
Works of these Advaita Acharyas are not available now, but were quoted in Brahma Sutras:

- Badari (referred to in Br. Su. I.2.30, III.1.1, IV.3.7, IV.4.10)
- Audulomi (referred to in Br. Su. I.3.21, III.4.45, IV.4.6)
- Kasakrtsna (referred to in Br. Su. I.4.220)
- Asmarathya (referred to in Br. Su. I.2.29, I.4.20)
- Atreya (referred to in Br. Su. III.4.4)
- Karsajini (referred to in Br. Su. III.1.9)
- Badarayana (author of Brahmasutra)

=== Post-Badarayana Acharyas ===
Works of the following Acharyas are available and are still being taught and studied:

- Gaudapada (700–780 approx.) (Karika on Mandukyopanishad)
- Govinda bhagavatpāda (750–850 approx.) (Wrote Brahmasiddhi)
- Adi Shankara (8th cent. CE–9th cent. CE) (Commentary on the Prasthanatrayi and Upadeśasāhasrī or 'A thousand teachings')

=== Post-Sankara Acharyas ===
- Sureśvara (8th century–9th century), also known as Vartikakara. (Treatise on Sankara's Taittiriyopanishad-commentary, Brhadaranyakopanishad-commentary, Naishkarmya Siddhi or "Perfection of the actionlessness", Manasollasa)
- Padmapada (8th century–9th century) (Pancapadika or treatise on the 5 chapters)
- Hastamalaka (8th century–9th century) (Wrote Hastamalakiyam)
- Vacaspati Mishra (841–900) (Bhamati, a treatise on Shankara's commentary of the brahmasutras)
- Sarvajnatma Muni (850–950) (Sankshepa-Sariraka)
- Sriharsha (1169–1225) (Wrote Khandana-khanda-khadya or "Sweets of refutation" against Nyaya)
- Prakasatma Yati (AD 1200) (Pancapadika-Vivarana)
- Citsukha (12th century–Early part of 13th century) (Wrote Citsukhi, wrote among the first known biographies of Shankara called Brihat Shankaravijayam)
- Ananda Giri (13th century)- also known as the Tikakara. (Wrote treatises and commentaries on almost all the works of Sankara, Compiled a biography of Adi Shankara called "Prachina Shankaravijayam", which is considered the most authoritative, reliable and the most widely-cited hagiography of Sankara. (It is said nobody knows the mind of Sankara, better than Ananda Giri.)
- Vimuktatma (AD 1200) (Ishtasiddhi or "Proof for God")
- Amalananda (AD 1247) (Vedanta-Kalpataru, a commentary on Bhamati of Vacaspati Misra)
- Bĥaratī Tīrtha (1328-1380), the teacher of Vidyaranya (Dŗg-Dŗśya-Viveka)
- Vidyaranya (1350–1386) (Wrote Pancadasi, Compiled a biography of Shankara called Madhaviya shankara digvijaya.)
- Sadananda Yogindra (mid 15th century) (Vedantasara, the most popular introductory text in Advaita Vedanta)
- Dharmaraja Adhvarindra (1550–1650) (Vedanta-Paribhasha, an epistemological work on Advaita Vedanta)
- Nrsimha Ashrama (1500–1600)
- Madhusudana Saraswati (1565–1650) (Wrote a philosophical treatise called Advaita-siddhi or "Evidence on the account of Nonduality")
- Appayya Dikshita (AD 1603) (Parimala, Siddhanta-lesa-sangraha on theory of the single soul)
- Lakshmidhara Kavi (Advaita-Makaranda)

== Neo-Vedanta ==
While strictly speaking only members of the Dashanami Sampradaya belong to the Advaita Guru Paramparā, Advaita Vedanta has attracted popular recognition since the 19th century, and Neo-Vedanta movements have developed with roots in, of similarities with, the Advaita tradition.

=== Ramakrishna Order ===
- Sri Ramakrishna Paramahamsa

- Swami Vivekananda (1863–1902), disciple of Sri Ramakrishna, wrote books on four Hindu Yogas: Bhakti Yoga, Jnana Yoga, Karma Yoga and Raja Yoga. The Complete Works of Swami Vivekananda contains a complete collection of transcribed lectures. He spoke at the Parliament of the World's Religions in Chicago in 1893.
- Disciples of Ramakrishna

=== Mata Amritanandamayi Math ===
Mata Amritanandamayi Math, founded by Sri Mata Amritanandamayi devi follows Advaita philosophy and traditions. The sanyasis are initiated in the Puri order of Dashanami Sampradaya. According to the tradition set forth by Adi Shankaracharya, the Puri Sannyasa tradition is characterised by the following – formal allegiance to the Shringeri Math

- First Acharya (teacher) - Sureśvaracharya
- Sampradaya (customs) - Bhurivara Sampradaya
- Kshetra (Temple) – Rameswaram
- Deva (God) – Adi Varaha Swamy (The incarnation of Lord Vishnu in the form of a boar)
- Devi (Goddess) – Kamakshi
- Veda – Yajurveda
- Upanishad – Kaṭhopaniṣad
- Mahavakya (statement revealing the nature of Absolute Reality ) – Ahaṁ Brahmāsmi
- Tirtha (Holy River) – Tungabhadra River
- Gotra (descent or lineage) – Bhaveshavar Rishi

Swami Amritaswarupananda Puri was the first to be initiated as Sanyasin by Sri Mata Amritanandamayi devi in this order. Swami Amritatmananda Puri, Swami Ramakrishnananda Puri, Swami Pranavamritananda Puri, Swamini Krishnamrita Prana and Swami Poornamritananda Puri are other few notable sanyasis initiated in this order.

=== Divine Life Society, Chinmaya Mission, Arsha Vidya Gurukulam ===
- Swami Tapovan Maharaj (1889–1957): A Virakta mahatma, Guru of Swami Chinmayananda post the latter's Sanyas Deeksha by Swami Sivananda
- Swami Sivananda (1887–1963): Hindu Saint who founded the Divine Life Society in Rishikesh, India. Author of more than 300 works of theology and philosophy. According to his disciples, achieved Moksha upon death. Bestowed sanyasa upon

- Swami Krishnananda (1922–2001), Hindu saint who was the General Secretary of the Divine Life Society in Rishikesh, India from 1958 to 2001. Foremost disciple of Swami Sivananda. Author of more than 200 works of theology and philosophy. According to disciples, achieved Moksha upon death.
- Swami Chinmayananda (1916–1993), (1916–1993), Sannyas diksha bestowed by Swami Sivananda in Rishikesh. Disciples founded the Chinmaya Mission; 'Chinmaya' means "pure consciousness.".

- Swami Dayananda Saraswati, (1930–2015) Founder of 'Arsha Vidya' tradition. He has set up Gurukulams in Rishikesh, Coimbatore, Nagpur, Saylorsburg (USA), has taught ten long-term courses in Advaita Vedanta, and has initiated more than 200 disciples into Sannyasa, among them being; Swami Paramarthananda and Swami Tattvavidananda. The advaita teacher and author Sri Vasudevacharya is also a disciple.

- Swami Chidananda (1916–2008)
- Swami Shantananda Saraswati (1934-2005)

=== Other teachers ===
- Mannargudi Raju Sastri (1815–1903), Formed 'The Advaita Sabha' for propagating the tenets of the Advaita faith.
- Sri Narayana Guru (1856–1928)- Vedic scholar, mystic philosopher, prolific poet and social reformer, from the present-day Kerala.
- Sri Aurobindo (1872–1950) Bengali philosopher-sage who synthesized Advaita thought with Western philosophical theories of evolution.
- Tibbetibaba (-d.1930) - Hindu Bengali Saint whose life was based on both Advaita Vedanta and Mahayana principles.
- Swami Atmananda (1883–1959) lived in Kerala.
- Prajnanapada (1891–1974), disciple of Niralamba Swami and a great exponent of Advaita philosophy. He was in charge of Channa Ashram in West Bengal, India.
- Bhagawan Nityananda (1897?–1961) was an Indian guru. His teachings are published in the "Chidakash Gita". Nityananda was born in Koyilandy (Pandalayini), Kerala, South India. His teachings are simple and on the nonduality.
- Swami Karpatri (1905–1980), a well-known sannyasi of Varanasi
- Swami Parthasarathy (1927- ), Popularly referred to as 'Swamiji', Parthasarathy is known as the modern exponent of Vedanta. He has written 10 books in all, including commentaries on Bhagavad Gita, Atmabodha, Bhaja Govindam and many other books. His ashram is situated around 100 km from Mumbai in the hills of Malavli, near Lonavla.
- G. Balakrishnan Nair Vedanta scholar, Sanskrit academic, philosopher, author and interpreter of the scriptures and Vedanta.
- Vagbhatananda Kunjikkannan (1885-1939). intellectual figure, Social Reformer and Advaitin.

== Advaita Vedanta interpreted ==
=== Inchegeri Sampradaya ===
The Inchegeri Sampradaya is rooted in the Nath-tradition, but is popularly regarded as Advaita Vedanta.

- Siddharameshwar Maharaj

- Sri Nisargadatta Maharaj (1897–1981) - A 20th-century master of Advaita from Mumbai, I Am That (1973, collected talks)

- Ramesh Balsekar (1917–2009)

=== Ramana Maharshi ===
Ramana Maharshi underwent a profound religious experience when he was 16, whereafter he left home to become a sanyassin. While his own (spare) writings reveal his Tamil Saivite background, devotees with a Brahmon and/or Neo-Vedanta background have interpreted him in an Advaita Vedanta framework. His popularisation in the west was initially aided by a Theosophical framework, while his devotee Poonja spawned the Neo-Advaita movement, which was also influenced by Bhagwan Shree Rajneesh.

- Shri Ramana Maharshi (1879–1950) the silent sage of Tamil Nadu who had a profound realization of nonduality.

- Sri H.W.L. Poonja (1910–1997), or Papaji. Devotee of Sri Ramana Maharshi, he denied being part of any formal tradition, and remained always available, welcoming newcomers to his home and satsangs.

== See also ==
- List of teachers of Vedanta
- List of Hindus

== Sources ==
- Isayeva, Natalia (1993). Shankara and Indian Philosophy. Albany: State University of New York Press (SUNY). ISBN 0-7914-1282-2.
- Nikhalananda, Swami (1931), Drg-Drsya-Viveka. An inquiry into the nature of the 'seer' and the 'seen.', Sri Ramakrishna Asrama
- Sundaresan, Vidyasankar (2000). "Conflicting hagiographies and history: The place of Śaṅkaravijaya texts in Advaita tradition" (PDF). International Journal of Hindu Studies. 4 (2). Springer: 109–184. doi:10.1007/s11407-000-0004-7.
