= List of teachers of Vedanta =

This is a list of teachers of Vedanta, a Hindu philosophical system.

== Pre-19th century ==
- Vasishta Maharishi
- Shakti Maharishi
- Parashara Maharishi
- Krishna Dwaipayana Vyasa
- Sri Shuka Acharya
- Badarayana
- Gaudapada
- Govinda Bhagavatpada
- Adi Shankara Bhagavatpada
- Sureśvara
- Padmapāda
- Hastamalakacharya
- Totakacharya
- Appayya Dikshitar
- Vācaspati Miśra
- Vedanta Desika
- Vidyaranya
- Dnyaneshwar
- Vyasathirtha
- Madhusudhana Saraswati
- Nimbarka
- Vijnanabhiksu
- Srimanta Sankardeva
- Mahadevendra Saraswathi V

== 19th-21st century ==
- Bannanje Govindacharya
- Ramakrishna Paramahamsa
- Ramana Maharshi
- Swami Vivekananda
- Swami Dayananda Saraswati
- Swami Sivananda Saraswati
- Swami Satyananda Saraswati
- Swami Chinmayananda Saraswati
- Swami Ganapathi Sachchidananda
- Swami Krishnananda
- Swami Parthasarathy
- Swami Rama Tirtha
- Mannargudi Raju Sastri
- Jayendra Saraswati
- Nisargadatta Maharaj
- Sacchidananda Shivabhinava Narasimha Bharathi
- Chandrashekhara Bharati III
- Bharati Teertha Swamigal
- Sri Vidhusekara Bharathi
- Satchidananda Saraswati
- Paramahansa Yogananda
- Sacchidanandendra Saraswati
- Swami Tejomayananda
- Swami Ranganathananda, Ramakrishna Math and Ramakrishna Mission
- Atmananda Krishna Menon
- Swami Chidaananda Puri
- Sadhu Bhadreshdas
- Sri Sri Ravi Shankar
- Anandmurti Gurumaa

== See also ==
- List of teachers of Advaita Vedanta
