= Amreshwar Dham =

Hindu temple complex in Jharkhand, India

Amreshwar Dham, Khunti
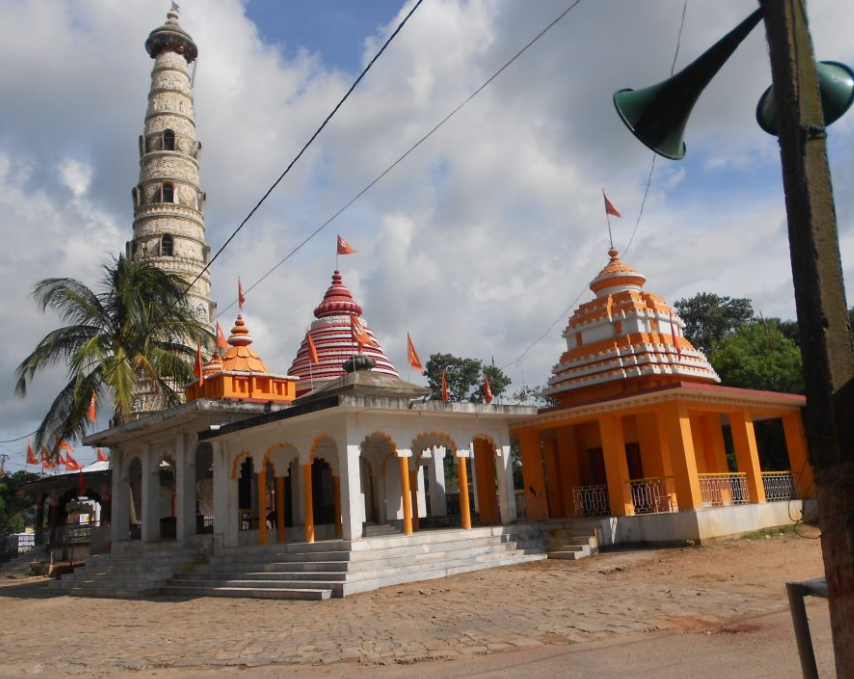
- Aamreshwar Dham Temple; Established 1985

- Location within Jharkhand

Religion
- Affiliation: Hinduism
- Deity: Shiva
- Festival: Maha Shivaratri

Location
- Location: Khunti
- State: Jharkhand
- Country: India
- Interactive map of Amreshwar Dham, Khunti
- Coordinates: 23°01′51″N 85°11′58″E

Angrabari or Amreshwar Dham located near Khunti, Jharkhand, is a Hindu temple complex dedicated to the Hindu deity Shiva. The temple is built and maintained by Amreshvar Dham Prabandh Samiti. It was renamed as Amreshwar Dham by the Sage Shankaracharya Swami Swarupananda Saraswati. It is situated on the Khunti-Torpa road NH-20 approximately 45 km (28 mi) from Ranchi, the capital city of Jharkhand, and 9 km (5.6 mi) from the district headquarters.

The temple site also houses several other Hindu deities including Ganesha, Rama, Sita and Hanuman. There is a large crowd of Shiva devotees here during the month of Sawan and on the day of Maha Shivaratri.
