= Gnanananda Giri =

Philosopher

Gnanananda was an Indian guru, referred to by followers as Swami Sri Gnanananda Giri. He was the Disciple of the Sri Sivaratna Giri Swamigal and one of the leaders (Peetathipathis) of the Jyotir Math, one of the four Mutts established by Adi Sankara. This lineage of Peetathipathis is also called the 'Giri' Paramparai, as seen from the Peetathipathis' name which ends with 'Giri'. Gnanananda is a Mahayogi, Siddha Purusha, Himalayan sage and Indian philosopher. He believed in Advaita Vedanta because of his lineage. He had a number of followers including Vidyananda, Triveni and Dasagiri. He blessed Hari to 1. Haridhos Giri to do Namasankeerthanam and Guru Bakthi Prachara Swami had a number of accomplished followers through his abnormally long tenure- Bramanamda who took samadhi at Puskar, Achutadasa of Polur. He loved obsurity. He changed identity to avoid being recognised .

== Birth and childhood ==
Sources report his birth as early 19th century in the village Mangalapuri in North Kanara District of Karnataka. to an orthodox Brahmin couple, Venkoba Ganapati and SriMathi Sakku Bai. He was named Subramanyan at birth, and left his home at a very early age. His birthday is celebrated on the birth star of Kritika in January (the Tamil month of Thai).

== Sanyasa ==
Sivaratna Giri Swami accepted Subramanyan as his disciple and named him Pragnana Brahmachari. Sivaratna Giri initiated Gnanananda in the traditional manner into the Giri order of Jyotir Mutt and gave him the monastic name of Sri Gnanananda Giri. Sivaratna Gnanananda adorned the 6th lineage of Peetam of Jagadguru Totakacharya for some time. However, he nominated one Ananda Giri in his place and retired to the height of the Himalayas for penance. Gnananda spent many years at the sacred spot of Gangotri and icy caves of the Himalayas in intense tapas. He travelled extensively on foot, spanning the whole India and Tibet, Nepal, Burma, Sri Lanka and Malaya. He met many holy men over the course of his pilgrimage.

== Teaching and establishment of ashrams ==
Gnanananda returned to India and established an ashram at Attayampatti in Salem and then at Siddhalingamadam near Villupuram. The most famous ashram, named "Sri Gnanananda Tapovanam", is situated two miles away from Tirukkoyilur. Gnanananda built temples for the deities of Gnanaganesa, Gnanaskandan, Gananapurisa, Gnanambika, Mahalaksmi, Gnana Venugopala, Gnana Bhairavar and Gnana AnjaneyanShiva in Tapovanam. Another ashram was constructed in Yercaud, a hill station near Salem. It was called "Pranavanilayam". This was a retreat for contemplatives. Giri wanted to develop it as a centre for comparative religion. In contrast to Tapovanam, no rituals were permitted in Yercaud. The central emphasis was on meditation and dhyana.

Swami Gnanananda Giri taught a number of paths based on the aptitude of his disciples. Therefore, some of disciples are conversant in the "path of knowledge" (jñāna-marga) while others are the "path of works" (karma-marga) and still others follow the "path of faith" (bhakti-marga). His senior monastic disciple Vidyananda Giri was a profound scholar and linguist and brought out Tamil translations of Shankara's commentaries on the Bhagavad Gita and the Upanishads. He also made available Tamil versions of famous Advaitic texts like Sanatsujatiyam. He trained followers in Advaitic Nidhidhyasana. Another of his lineage, Satyananda was associated with Franklin Merrell-Wolff and taught his method of "introceptive knowledge". Satyananda lineage is not mentioned in the book Sadguru Gnanananda, a Bharatiya Vidya Bhavan edition written by Madras University professors. The book is well researched in terms of what is available to know about the Swami Gnanananda

He is considered as the Guru of Avudai Akkal and she mentions his name in almost all her songs.

Swami Gnanananda Giri realised that the path of Vichara and Nidhidhyasana was confined to a few philosophically advanced aspirants. For devotees at a lesser level, he advocated stuti, japa and nama sankirtan. He was well versed in all the modes of Bhajana Sampradaya and he held that Hari Bhajana for ordinary devotees was the easiest way to attain "Moksha". He had chosen Haridhos Giri propagated the importance of Namasankeetanam. Haridhos carried his guru's (Gnanananda's) sandals (Paadhuka) with him to all the holy places he went to. He also visited many holy places with his Guru Paadhuka to propagate the importance of singing god's praises ("NamaSankeerthanam") as instructed by his guru.

Whilst talking about HH Sri Paramahamsa Parivrajakacharya Varya Jagathguru Sri Gnanananda Giri Swamigal of Jyotir Mutt (Sathgurunathar), one repeatedly remembers what He said: "No one can write my life because it has not been on the surface for men to see."

"Thatha Swamigal" is the affectionate title by which many people, young and old, including well-known saints, use to refer to Sathgurunathar in reference to his "thatha" (grandfather) like nature and with respect towards the thousands of years Gurunathar has stayed on Earth. The legacy of Sathgurunathar is known by many and below is a description of the type of saint He was and continues to be, by our very own HH Jagathguru Sri Namananda Giri Swamigal:

"Sages like Sri Gnanananda Giri Swami are siddha purusha-s. They live beyond times. One could gauge the history of these great saints only from the incidents one comes across in their life and the sermons they give from time to time. Yet, they may not be the complete biography. These saints appear in places at their will and disappear from the scene once the purpose of their avatar is over. They live for long. They have no date of birth or date of demise. Even when He was living and adorning the Peetam of Tapovanam, there were 'samadhis' for Gurunathar in the far off Kadirgamam in Sri Lanka and at Rajasthan in India [just to name a few]. When we have proof of His having lived during the days of Kabirdas, Sri Ramakrishna Paramahamsa and Swami Brahmananda, we realise that He is beyond the confines of times."
