= Shobha Gosa =

Indian women's activist

- Born: Shobha Rani Gosa
- Citizenship: India
- Education: B. Sc. (Sri Krishnadevaraya), M. A. (Oxford Brookes)
- Occupation: Counselor
- Years active: 2002-present
- Organization(s): Young People for Life India, Shivarampally (Telangana)
- Known for: Espousal of gender concerns
- Movement: Women's empowerment
- Family: The Rev. Gosa Devadanam, CSI
- Awards: Sadguru Gnananda Fellowship (2014), Young Women Achiever Award (2011)

Shobha Gosa is an Indian women's activist and leadership developer, promoting the movement among youth towards women empowerment through sustained education. She is also involved in interfaith understanding, having contributed papers.

== Education and career ==
After her undergraduate education in Anantapur at Sri Krishnadevaraya University, Shobha began her career with Non-governmental organisations in India in the new millennium, notably the Henry Martyn Institute, Shivarampally. In 2012, she founded Young People for Life India as a registered Trust to achieve her vision of women empowerment.

== Recognition ==
Shobha's espousal of causes ranging from youth leadership, talent management, communication skills and behavioral management, as well as gender empowerment and peace building have been recognised over the past many years. In 2011, on the sidelines of United Nations International Women's Day Centenary Celebrations held by United Nations, Government of Andhra Pradesh and State Institute of Rural Development in Hyderabad, she was awarded a Young Women Achiever Award along with three other women. In 2014, Shobha was a recipient of Sadguru Gnananda Fellowship awarded by a Chennai-based institution, Manava Seva Dharma Samvardhani. The citation read,

.....Founder, Young People for Life India working for the empowerment of youth in Hyderabad through skill building and counselling.
