= Shankaracharya =

Religious title in the Advaita tradition

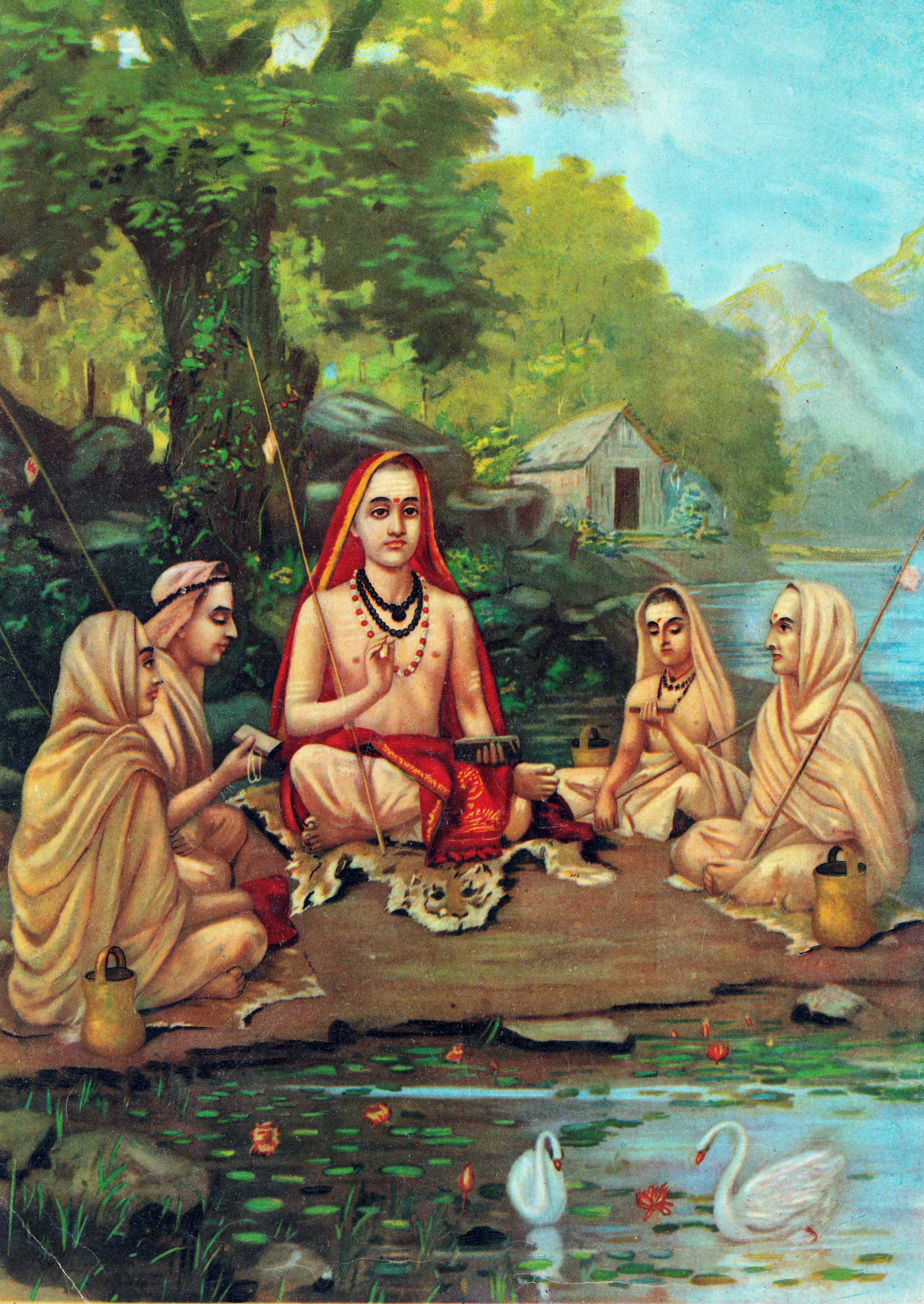
Adi Shankaracharya with his four disciples - Padmapadacharya, Sureshwaracharya, Hastamalakacharya and Totakacharya.

Shankaracharya (Sanskrit: शङ्कराचार्य, IAST: Śaṅkarācārya, "Shankara-acharya") is a religious title used by the heads of amnaya monasteries called mathas in the Advaita Vedanta tradition of Hinduism. The title derives from Adi Shankara; teachers from the successive line of teachers retrospectively dated back to him are known as Shankaracharyas.

== Etymology ==
The word Shankaracharya is composed of two parts, Shankara and Acharya. Acharya is a Sanskrit word meaning "teacher", so Shankaracharya means a "teacher in the tradition of Shankara".

== Establishment of the tradition ==
Adi Shankara, the first Shankaracharya, set up four monasteries, known as Mathas or Peethams, in the North, South, East and West of India, to be headed by Self-realised men who would be known as Shankaracharyas. They would take on the role of teacher and could be consulted by anyone with sincere spiritual inquiries, and they would guide humanity in times of trouble and give solace. Apart from the four, another monastery, Kanchi Kamkoti Peetham in South India, is also believed to have been established by Adi Shankara. The table below gives an overview of the four main Shankaracharya Amnaya Mathas famously founded by Adi Shankara.

Shishya (lineage)	Direction	Maṭha	Mahāvākya	Veda	Sampradaya	Present Shankaracharya
Padmapāda	East	Puri Govardhanmaṭha Pīṭhaṃ	Prajñānam brahma (Consciousness is Brahman)	Rig Veda	Bhogavala	Swami Nischalananda Saraswati
Sureśvara	South	Sringeri Śārada Pīṭhaṃ	Aham brahmāsmi (I am Brahman)	Yajur Veda	Bhurivala	Sri Bharati Tirtha
Hastāmalakācārya	West	Dvāraka Sharada Pīṭhaṃ	Tattvamasi (That thou art)	Sama Veda	Kitavala	Swami Sadanand Saraswati
Toṭakācārya	North	Badari Jyotirmaṭha Pīṭhaṃ	Ayamātmānam brahma (This Atman is Brahman)	Atharva Veda	Nandavala	Swami Avimukteshwaranand Saraswati (disputed)

== See also ==
- Kalady, Kerala, Birthplace of Jagadguru Adi Shankaracharya
- Govardhan Peetham (East), Puri, Odisha
- Dwarka Sharada Peetham (West), Dwarka, Gujarat
- Jyotirmaya Peetham (North), Joshimath, Uttarakhand
- Sringeri Sharada Peetham (South), Sringeri, Karnataka
- Kanchi Kamakoti Peetham, Kancheepuram, Tamil Nadu
- Sri Jayendra Saraswathi, Shankaracharya of Kanchi
- Swami Abhinava Vidya Tīrtha, Shankaracharya of Sringeri
- Swami Bharati Tīrtha, Shankaracharya of Sringeri
- Swami Bharatikrishna Tīrtha, scholar; mathematician; first Sankaracharya to visit the West
- Swami Brahmananda Sarasvati, Srividya Siddh Sankaracharya of Jyotirmaya Pitha, Shankara Matha, Badrinath
- Swami Shantanand Saraswati, Shankaracharya of Jyotirmaya Pitha
- Swami Swarupananda Sarasvati, Shankaracharya of Jyotirmaya Pitha, Sankara Matha, Badrinath
- Swami Candrasekhara Bharati, Shankaracharya of Sringeri
- Swami Saccidananda Bharati, Shankaracharya of Sringeri
- Swami Sacchidananda Bharati, Shankaracharya of Sringeri
- Swami Sacchidananda Shivabhinava Nṛusimha Bharati, Shankaracharya of Sringeri
- Swami Vidyaranya Tīrtha, Shankaracharya of Sringeri
- Sri Sri Raghaveshwara Bharati, Jagadguru of Ramachandrapura Matha
