= Haridhos Giri =

Indian philosopher

Haridhos Giri - Guruji

Personal life
- Born: Thennangur, Tamil Nadu, India
- Honors: Hindu Revivalism, Panduranga Temple, Thennangur

Religious life
- Religion: Hinduism
- Philosophy: Advaita Vedanta

Religious career
- Teacher: Sivaratna Giri, Gnanananda Giri

Swami Haridhos Giri (also Haridas Giri), affectionately called Guruji, was born in the month of Margazhi (December-January) in the Tamil calendar with the birth star of Utharattathi. Giri was born in the village of Thennangur, Tamil Nadu, South India.

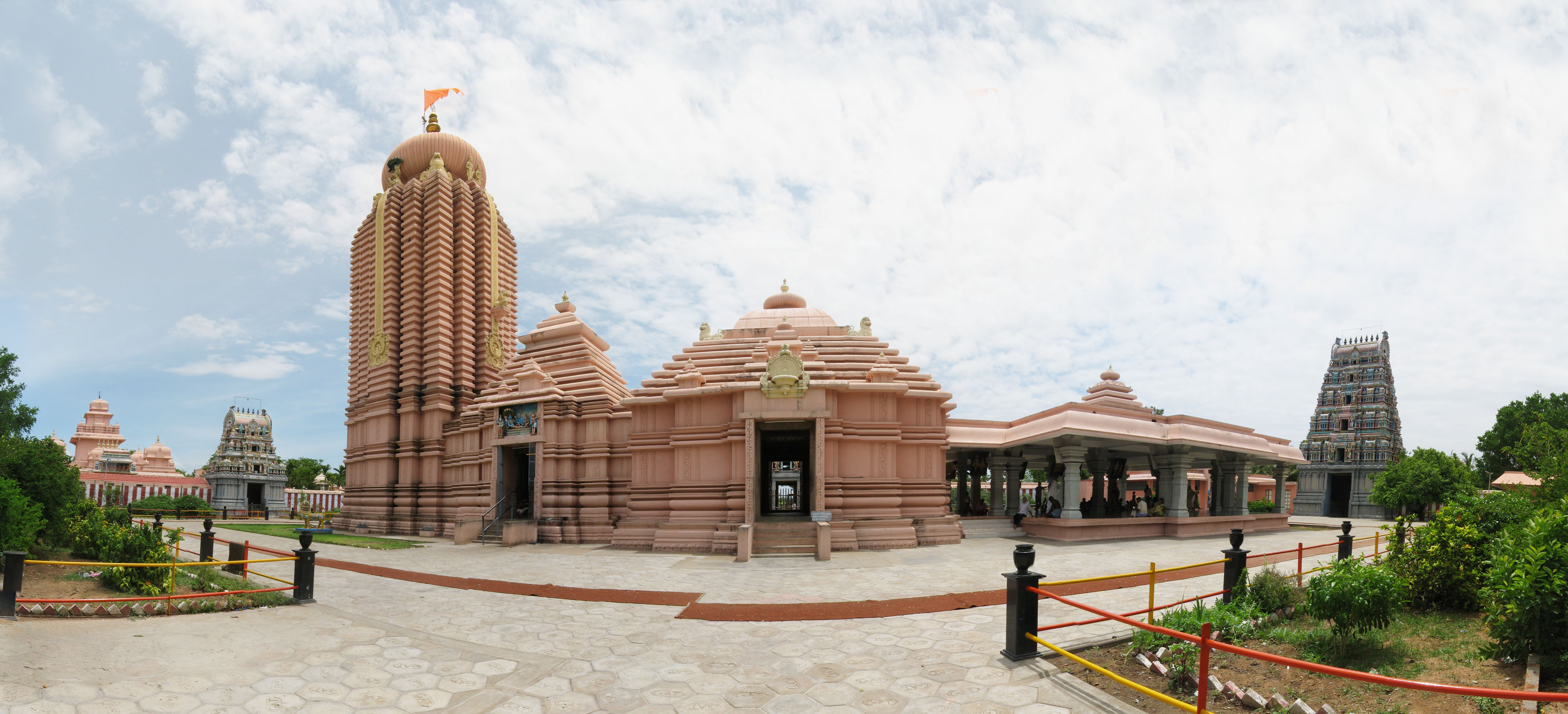
Haridhos Giri built the Panduranga Temple, dedicated to Vitthala, a manifestation of the deity Vishnu.

== Biography ==
Swami Haridhos Giri was instrumental in spreading Dakshina Sampradaya Namasankeertanam in India. Giri had traveled to many countries; giving many speeches and singing bhajans of Dakshina Bharatha Sampradaya. He is the Chief Disciple of Swami Gnanananda Giri. He devoted his entire life to serve his guru, Swami Gnanananda Giri. During his time, he established spiritual haven in Thennangur-Dakshina Halasyam in South India. Swami Haridhos Giri built the Panduranga Temple, dedicated to Vitthala, a manifestation of the deity Vishnu, shrine of his beloved guru Swami Gnanananda Giri and also has built cottages for devotees to stay, temples, and canteens. Swami Haridhos Giri built the place within 14 years.

He traveled all over the world including Singapore, Malaysia and other countries to spread Namasankeerthanam, as he was instructed by his guru Swami Gnanananda Giri. He has thousands of devotees all over the world.

== Ecstasy and oneness ==
On September 4, 1994, in Koteswar, Haridhos Giri took to Jalasamadhi in the Alaknanda river in full consciousness in front of his devotees, He was later swept away by the currents of the river and was not found. There is a Hindu temple dedicated to Koteswar Mahadev in Koteswar. Swami Naamananda Giri, Principal Disciple of Swami Haridhos Giri built a bhajan platform in memory of Swami Haridhos Giri.Swami Haridhos Giri disappeared on September 4, 1994 and has not been seen since.

== Photo gallery ==
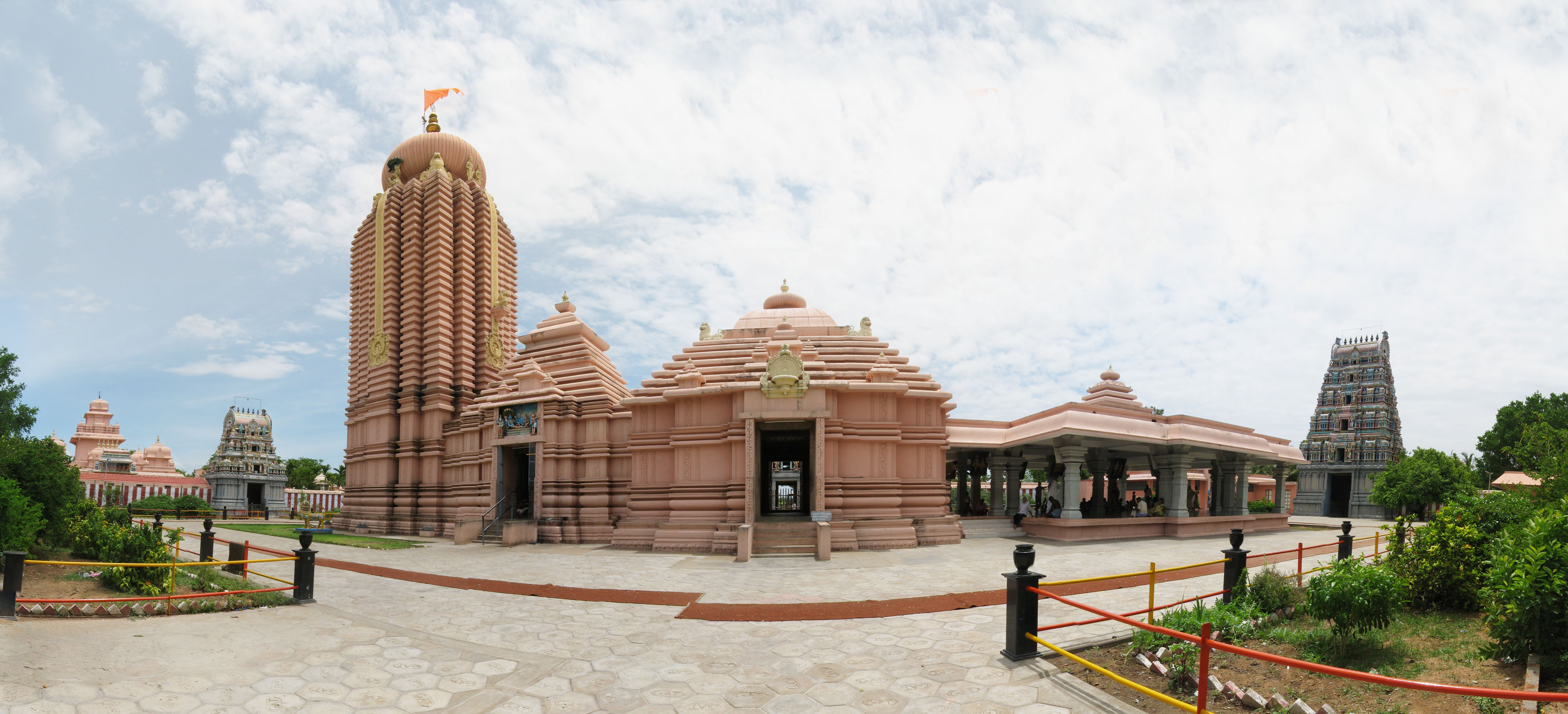
