= Swami Karpatri =

Indian Hindu saint and revivalist

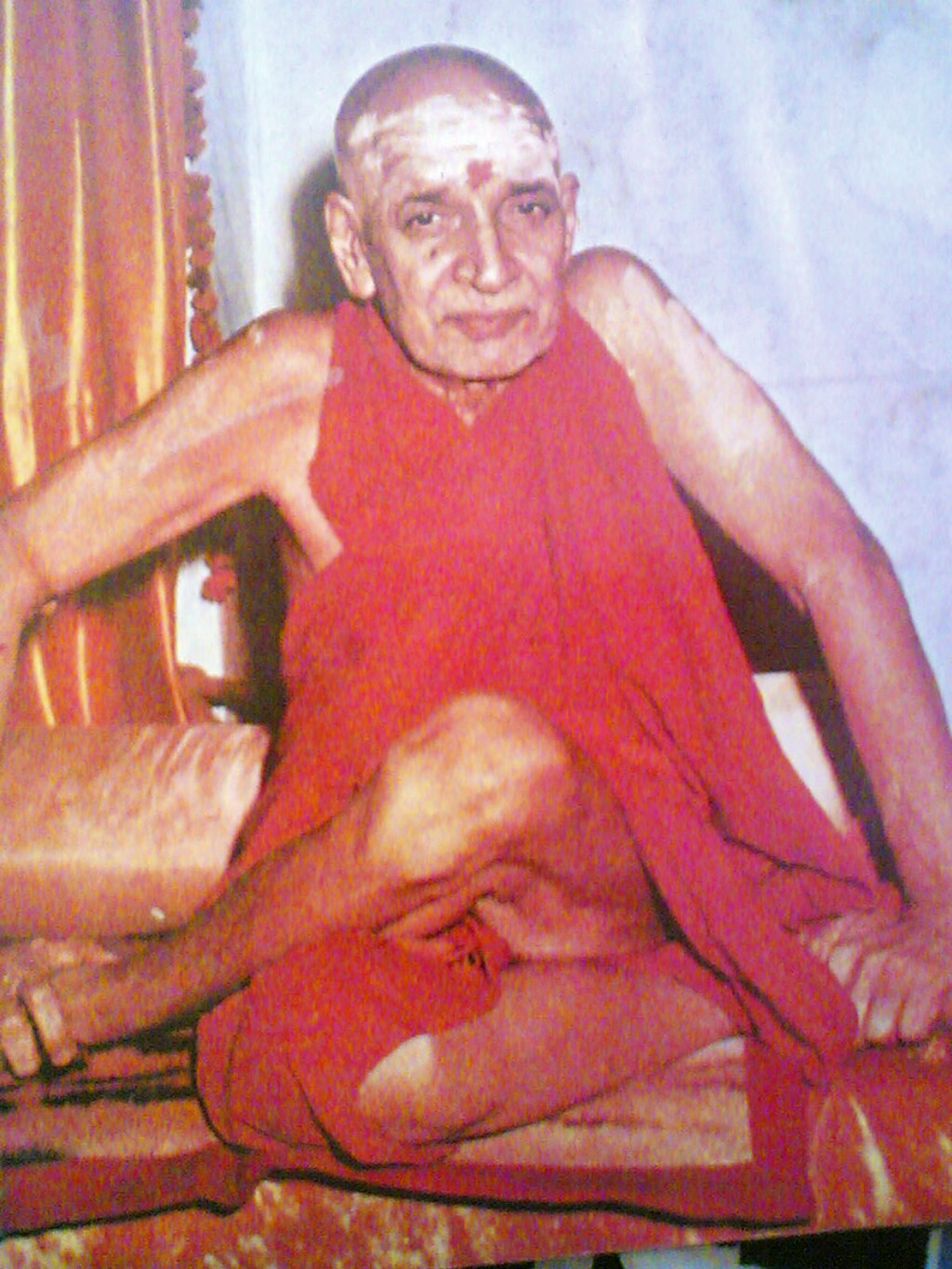
- Swami in his ashram in Varanasi.

Founder of Akhil Bharatiya Ram Rajya Parishad
- In office 1948–1982
- Preceded by: Office established
- Succeeded by: Shankaracharya Swaroopanand Saraswati elected as first president

Personal life
- Born: Har Narayan Ojha; 11 August 1907 Pratapgarh, United Provinces of Agra and Oudh, British India
- Died: 7 February 1982 (aged 74) Varanasi, Uttar Pradesh, India
- Known for: Hindu revivalism and activism

Religious life
- Religion: Hinduism
- Denomination: Dashanami Sampradaya
- Founder of: Akhil Bharatiya Ram Rajya Parishad
- Philosophy: Advaita Vedanta

Religious career
- Teacher: Brahmananda Saraswati

Swami Karpatri (11.8.1907–7.2.1982), born as Har Narayan Ojha, was a Hindu saint and revivalist who founded the Akhil Bharatiya Ram Rajya Parishad. He was also a writer and led several pro-Hindu movements, including the cow protection movement. A sannyasi of the Dashanami Sampradaya, he belonged to the Smārta branch of Sanatan Dharma (Hinduism).

== Early life and education ==
He was born in a Saryuparin Brahmin family in a small village of Bhatni in Pratapgarh, United Provinces of Agra and Oudh, British India (now modern-day Uttar Pradesh). From early childhood he had no interest in worldly matters and was married to Srimati Mahadevi at the age of 9 in the year 1916. He planned to leave home in order to attain Sannyasa, though his father insisted him to give them a child before leaving. After which a girl child was born to him, after which he left his home at the age of 19.

Sometime after leaving home, he took vow of Brahmacharya (initiation into celibacy) from Swami Brahmananda Saraswati. After initiation, he was renamed Harihar Chaitanya and went to study in a gurukul in Narwar, Bulandshahr.

He stayed there for two years studying Vyakarana, Vedanta and 6 Darshanas (six schools of Hindu Philosophy) among other things. In 1927, he left the Gurukula and walking along the Ganga river, reached Uttarakhand where he spent the next three years in solitude that ended with him attaining Atmagyana or self-realisation.

He returned to his gurukul where he was welcomed as a Paramhansa (one who has self-realisation). It was during this period that he got his most popular name “Karpatri” as he used to receive alm of food in his cupped hands resembling a bowl. (Kar-hands, Patra-bowl, hence Karpatri literally means a man who receives alm in his cupped hands).

Sometime during 1931–32, at the age of 24, he formally accepted the Danda from the hands Swami Brahmananda Saraswati near Durga Kund, Varanasi. He was given Sanyasa Deeksha (initiation into monkhood) name of Swami Hariharananda Saraswati.

== Dharm Sangh ==
On the day of Vijayadashmi, He established Dharm Sangh in the year 1940. He travelled through all parts of India and established many branches of Dharm Sangh. The Slogan was:

Dharma ki Jaya Ho

Victory to Dharma!

Adharma ka Nash Ho

May Adharma Perish!

Dharm Sangh under leadership of Swami Karpatri helped the Noakhali victims of 1946 riots and provided them land, food and financial aid.

He re-converted Hindus who were forcibly made Muslims and gave them initiation under Rama-Nama.

He and his group was the first one to be jailed in Independent India. Even before Independence, In the year 1947, he started protests and meetings from the month of April. On the night of 14 August 1947, the members of Dharm Sangh were raising the slogans of "Bharat Akhand Ho" (May Bharat be united), All of them were jailed.

== Later life ==
He was a disciple of Shankaracharya of Jyotir Math Swami Brahmananda Saraswati. He spent most of his life at Varanasi.

Swami Nishchalananda Saraswati, the 145th Govardhan Peeth Shankaracharya of Puri, Odisha, is an eminent disciple of Swami Karpatri.

He initiated Alain Daniélou, a noted French Historian into Shaivite Hinduism under the name, Shiv Sharan.

== Politics ==
Other than DharmSangh, In 1948, Swami Karpatri founded the Akhil Bharatiya Ram Rajya Parishad (RRP), A traditionalist Hindu party. The RRP won three Lok Sabha seats in the 1952 Lok Sabha election and two in 1962. He led a movement against the Hindu Code Bill. He was also a prominent agitator in 1966 anti-cow slaughter agitation. On 18 April 1948, he founded the newspaper Sanmarg which promoted Sanatana Dharma and also advocated against the Hindu Code Bill and voiced opposition on cow slaughters.

== Death ==
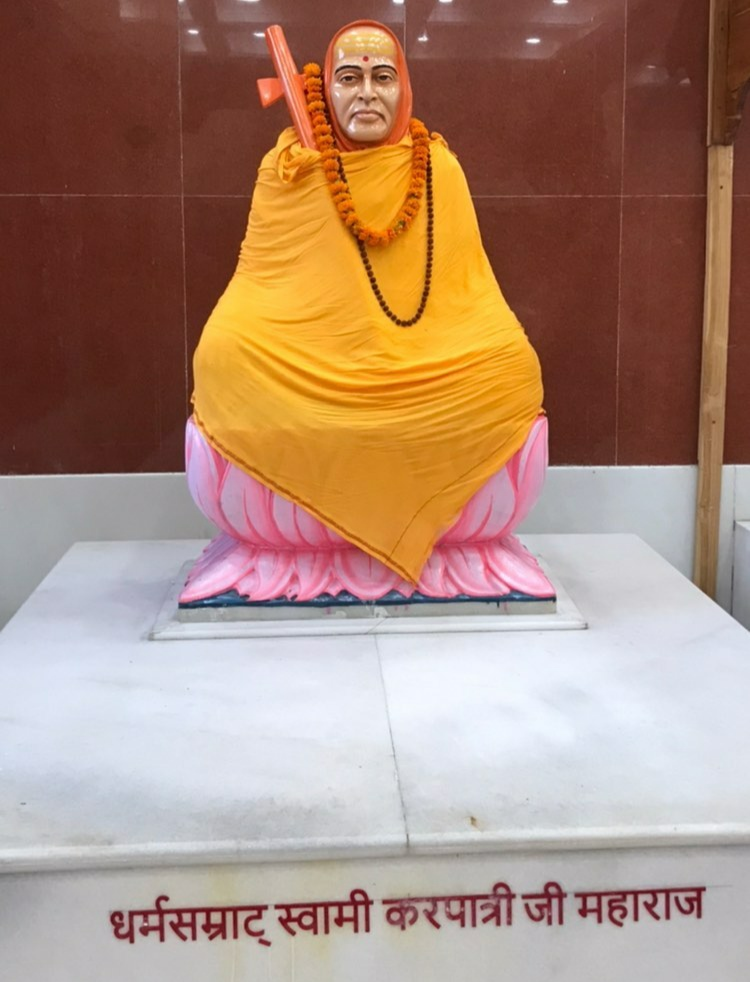
Statue of Swami in a temple.

On the day of his demise in the year 1982 (Magh Shukla Chaturdashi), he asked his disciples to sing the "Ayodhya Tyaga" story of Ramayana for him; he himself did the recitation of Sri Sukta and at the end by keeping the idol of Krishna on his chest, he died by reciting "Shiva Shiva Shiva" thrice.

== Debates ==
Swami Karpatri adhered to a strict no-compromise policy regarding Hindu laws and the Shastras. He was popularly referred to as "Dharmasamrat" (English: "Emperor of Dharma") by the masses.

In 1932, in his late 20s, he debated with Pandit Madan Mohan Malaviya on the topic of "Pranava" (ॐ). Malaviya ji accepted his defeat.

In 1964, a debate was held between traditional Sanatani scholars and members of the Arya Samaj. Although Swami Karpatri initially participated only as a spectator, he later joined the discussion, engaging directly with Yudhisthir Mimansak.

In 1965, Swami Karpatri engaged in a significant debate with Sri Vidyamanya Tirtha, a sanyasi of the Madhva Sampradaya, who had publicly challenged scholars to defend the doctrine of Advaita Vedanta. Swami Karpatri accepted the challenge, and the debate lasted for two days. Vidyamanya Tirtha posed numerous incisive questions, prompting Swami Karpatri to respond using logical interpretations of Vedanta. According to available accounts, Swami Karpatri was considered the victor of the debate because Vidyamanya Tirtha himself deviated from his own parampara theories during the debate.

== Books ==
Marxwad Aur Ramrajya: Criticism of Modern Ideologies such as Marxism, Socialism, Utilitarianism, Liberalism, Progressivism, Democratism, Feminism etc.

Vichar Piyush: A Summary of Swami Karpatri's Thoughts.

Bhakti Sudha: An anthology of various articles written by Swami Karpatri on importance of Bhakti.

Bhagwat Sudha: Explaining the Essence of Srimad Bhagvat Puran.

Sri Radha Sudha: A record of Swami Karpatri's speeches on Radha Sudha Nidhi.

Bhakti Rasarnava: A Unique work on Bhakti.

Pibata Bhagvata Rasamalaya: A Book dealing with Rasa of Srimad Bhagvata Purana.

Kaal Mimansa: A work dealing with the chronology in context of the Pauranic and Other Hindu Epic literature.

Kya Sambhog se Samadhi: A Simple Refutation of Osho's interpretation of Samadhi.

Capitalism, Socialism and Ramrajya: Refuting Osho's shallow understanding on these Ideologies.

Ramayana Mimansa: A Book with systematic analysis of the Hindu Epic Ramayana.

Ved Ka Swaroop Aur Pramanya: The epistemological significance and Structure of the Vedas.

Veda Pramanya Mimansa: Establishing the supreme authority of Vedas.

VedaSwarupVimarsh: A Short book defining the swarupa of Vedas while refuting the claims of Social Reformers and Modern day Scholars Like Swami Dayanand.

Samanvaya Samrajya Samrakshanam:A work dealing with coordination between various schools of Hinduism.

Ahamartha aur Parmartha Sara: A commentary on Patanjali's work "Parmarth Sara" with the refutation of Vishishta Advaita View.

Nastika-Astika Vaad: A point to point refutation of Nastika Arguments used against Astikas.

Videsh Yatra Shastriya Paksha: The Views of Hindu Shastras on Travelling Abroad.

Sankirtan Mimansa evam Varnashrama Dharma: A text Describing the maintenance of Varnashrama Dharma along with Holy Enchanting.

Rss aur Hindu Dharma: Deals with Structural criticism of Sangh-Sponsored Anti-Shastra ideology. Gau - Ek Samagra Chintan: The importance of Cow within Hinduism and Humanity as a whole.

Vedartha Parijata: Explaining the True Essence of the Vedas along with Commentary.

Kumbha Tithyadi Nirnaya: A treatise dealing with the astrological conclusions in context of Tithis and Kumbha Parva.

Yajurveda Commentary: Bhashya (Commentary) of Shukla Yajurveda by Swami Karpatri in eight parts.
