= Brahmananda Saraswati =

Indian gurudeva and monk (1871–1953)

His Holiness Jagadguru Shankaracharya Svāmī Brahmānanda Sarasvatī
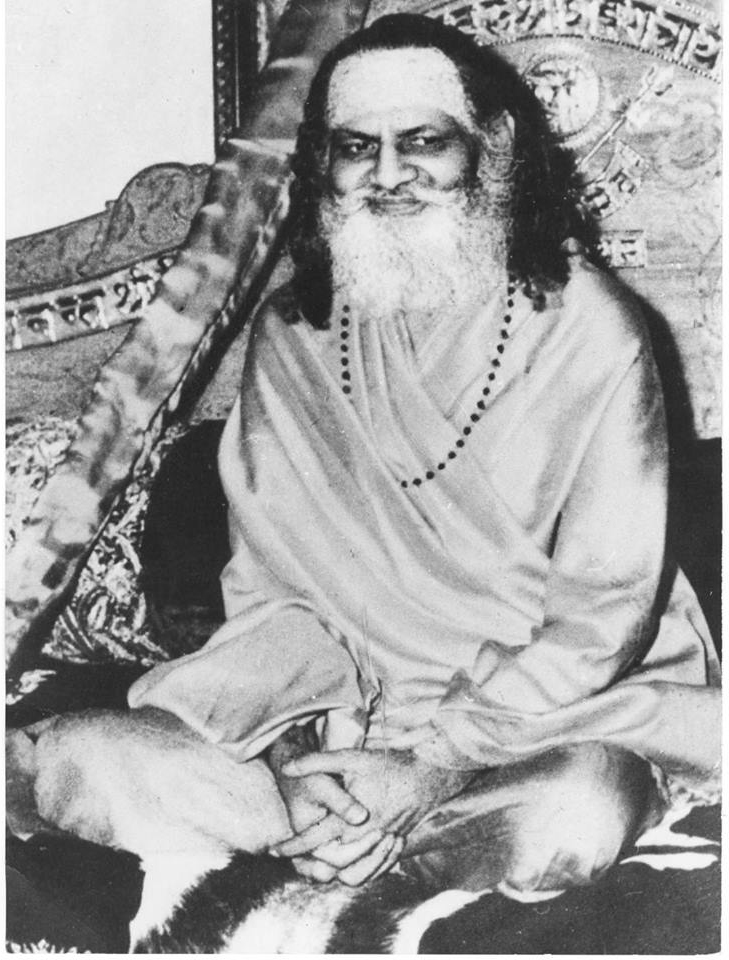

Personal life
- Born: Rajaram Mishra; 21 December 1871 Gana near SurhurpurAyodhya, North-Western Provinces, British India (present-day Uttar Pradesh, India)
- Died: 20 May 1953 (aged 81) Calcutta, West Bengal, India
- Honors: Shankaracharya of Jyotir Math

Religious life
- Religion: Hinduism
- Philosophy: Advaita Vedanta
- Ordination: 1 April 1941

Religious career
- Teacher: Svāmī Krsnānanda Sarasvatī
- Successor: Jagadguru Shankaracharya Swami Shree Swaroopanand Saraswati
- Disciples: Swami Karpatri, Swami Akhandanand Saraswati, Shantanand Saraswati, Maharishi Mahesh Yogi, Swaroopanand Saraswati

Swami Brahmananda Saraswati (IAST: Svāmī Brahmānanda Sarasvatī; 21 December 1871 – 20 May 1953), also known as Guru Dev (meaning "divine teacher"), was the Shankaracharya of the Jyotir Math monastery in India. Born into a Saryupareen Brahmin family, he left home at the age of nine in search of a spiritual master. At age fourteen, he became a disciple of Svāmī Kṛṣṇānanda Sarasvatī. At the age of 34, he was initiated into the order of Sannyas and became the Śaṅkarācārya of Jyotir Math in 1941 at age 70, the first person to hold that office in 150 years. His disciples included Swami Shantanand Saraswati, Transcendental Meditation founder Maharishi Mahesh Yogi, Svāmī Swarūpānanda Sarasvatī, and Swami Karpatri. According to the partisans of Shantānand Saraswati, Brahmānanda made a will five months before his death in 1953, naming Shantānand as his successor.

== Early life ==
Rajaram was born into a Mishra family in the village of Gana near Ayodhya in Uttar Pradesh, India. He was from a well to do, land owning Saryuparin Brahmin family. He was called Rajaram in his younger days and was also known as Maha Yogiraj. When he was seven, his grandfather died; contemplating this had a profound effect on Rajaram. At the age of nine, Rajaram left his home unannounced to follow a spiritual path of renunciation, but was soon returned to his parents by a policeman. On returning home, he asked his parents for permission to leave home and begin the life of a recluse. His parents wanted him to marry and live the life of a householder and asked their family guru to convince Rajaram to forget his dream of a reclusive life. The family guru, however, was so impressed with Rajaram's advanced state of wisdom and spiritual evolution that he gave up any attempt to change the boy's mind. The parents then also acquiesced and gave their permission for Rajaram to leave. Two days later, Rajaram formally renounced his family life and left his boyhood home in search of solitude in the Himalayas. Rajaram traveled by foot to the town of Haridwar and then on to Rishikesh, the gateway to the Himalayas. Here he began the search for a suitable guru or spiritual master. Rajaram met many wise sages, but none of them met his requirements of lifelong celibacy and an intimate knowledge and experience of the Vedas.

Five years later, at the age of fourteen, in a village in Uttar Kashi, Rajaram found his chosen master and became a disciple of Svāmī Krsnānanda Sarasvatī. At that time, Rajaram was given the name of Brahma Chaitanya Brahmacari. He then became the favorite disciple in his master's ashram and, according his master's instructions, he retired to a nearby cave and visited his master only once per week. The story of Rajaram's youthful renunciation is said to echo the life of Shankara, who reportedly began his renunciate life at the age of eight.

== Adult life ==
At the age of twenty five, (the later) Svāmī Brahmānanda Sarasvatī emerged from his cave and permanently rejoined his Master at his ashram. At the age of 34, he was initiated into the order of "Sannyas" by his master at the Hindu celebration called Kumbh Mela. At that time, he was ordained into the ascetic order and given the formal name Svāmī Brahmānanda Sarasvatī, that is, Svāmī Brahmānanda of the Sarasvatī branch of the medieval Dashanami Sampradaya monastic order. The greater portion of his life had been lived in total seclusion; he is reported to have created a cave in central India where he lived for forty years.

In 1941, at the age of 70, after repeated requests over a period of twenty years, Brahmānanda accepted the position of Jagadguru Shankaracharya (spiritual leader) of Jyotir Math, a position that had been vacant for more than 150 years. His disciple, Swami Karpatri, is reported to have been the person who brought the request for Brahmānanda to take the post after a search for a proper candidate was initiated by Dharma Maha Mandal. Brahmānanda is reported to have responded to the request by saying: "You want to put a lion to chains who moves about in the jungle freely. But if you so like, I honour your words and am ready to shoulder the responsibilities of the pitha (monastery) management. By shouldering this responsibility, I would be serving the cause for which Adi Śankarācārya stood. I fully dedicate myself for the mission."

The appointment of Swami Brahmānanda on 1 April 1941 was made by a group of monks and pandits based in the city of Varanasi, with the endorsement of Svāmī Bhāratī Kṛṣṇa Tīrtha, the Śaṅkarācārya of Purī and Svāmī Candraśekhara Bhāratī the Śaṅkarācārya of Śṛṅgeri. As respected supporters of religious institutions, the rulers of the cities of Garhwal, Varanasi and Darbhanga also endorsed Brahmānanda, and their recognition helped overcome opposition from previous claimants to the title. Brahmānanda was also seen as the embodiment of the qualifications mentioned in Vedic texts, and this assisted in his unhindered ascension to the position at the age of 70. He gave more than thirteen years of service.

Śaṅkarācārya Svāmi Brahmānanda Sarasvati was charged with reconstructing the temple and institution at Jyotir Math. Through the assistance of the local Deputy Commissioner and parties responsible for his nomination, he reclaimed the surrounding land that had been encroached upon by local farmers. Under his leadership, a two-story, 30-room building was constructed to serve as the "Peeth Bhawan" of Jyotir Math. He also supervised the final construction of the Shrine of Purnagiri Devi about 100 yards in front of the new monastery, which "the Darbhanga ruler" had begun just prior to his death. Saraswati's leadership was instrumental in re-establishing the Jyotir Math as "an important centre of traditional advaita teaching in northern India". He spent most of his time as Śaṅkarācārya traveling around northern India giving lectures in an effort to re-establish the correct understanding of Shankara's teachings.

Brahmānanda was visited by Rajendra Prasad, the President of India, and the philosopher Sarvapalli Radhakrishnan, who succeeded Prasad as President of India. In 1950, President Radhakrishnan is reported to have addressed His Holiness as "Vedanta Incarnate, the embodiment of truth".

Śaṅkarācārya Svāmi Brahmānanda Saraswati's disciples included Swami Shantānand Saraswati, TM founder Maharishi Mahesh Yogi, Swāmī Swarūpānanda Saraswatī and Swami Karpatri. Five months before his death in 1953, Brahmananda Saraswati made a will naming his disciple Swami Shantānand Saraswati as his successor as Shankaracharya of the Jyotir Math monastery.

== Legacy ==
The swami is said to have been one of those "rare siddhas (accomplished ones) who had the knowledge of Sri Vidya," and who was "modeled" after the great philosopher Adi Shankara. Swami Rama spoke highly of Swami Brahmananda after visiting him. Within a decade of becoming Shankaracharya, he accumulated many thousands of disciples and reinforced the concept of the Jyotir Math monastery as an important centre for Advaita philosophy. In 1979, the Federal Courts in Malnak v. Yogi found that TM teachers made multiple offerings and obeisances to a "deified Guru Dev" during the puja ceremony they performed before giving mantras to their students. However, it is the teaching of Maharishi Mahesh Yogi that "Individual is cosmic. Individual potential of life is cosmic potential. Individual is divine deep inside. Transcendental experience awakens that divinity in man...It's a human right to live divinity." In 2008, Maharishi Mahesh Yogi created a trust fund to support 30,000 Indian Vedic Pandits and named it after Brahmananda Saraswati.

Gurudeva developed a modified practice of meditation, suitable to the householder engaged in the affairs of everyday life. This method was spread globally by Maharishi Mahesh Yogi Gurudeva is referenced in the Beatles' song "Across the Universe" in the words " Jai Guru Deva", after the group spent some time in Mahesh Yogi's ashram in Rishikesh. Though they only stayed there a number of weeks and afterwards expressed misgivings about their teacher, he appears to have made a lasting impression on them, especially on George Harrison. The song was later written by John Lennon and shows influences of the use of hallucinogens.

=== Honorifics ===
- His Holiness
- Gurudev (meaning "divine teacher")
- Maharaj
