= Saraon =

- village
- Location in Bihar, India Saraon (India)
- Coordinates: 25°2′9.81″N 84°15′43.12″E
- Country: India
- State: Bihar
- District: Rohtas

Languages
  - Official: Bhojpuri, Hindi
- Time zone: UTC+5:30 (IST)
- PIN: 821310
- ISO 3166 code: IN-BR
- Nearest city: Dehri
- Literacy: 99.99%%

Saraon is a village situated in Rohtas District of Bihar state, India. It is 20 km. from the Dehri-on-Son railway station on the way to Bikramganj via Nasriganj.

Saraon is the part of Panchgaon (five villages of Saryupareen Brahmins Pandey). Other villages are Hawdih, Virodih, Mangitpur and Sohgi.
