= Govardhan Math =

Religious institution in Hinduism

- गोवर्द्धन मठ
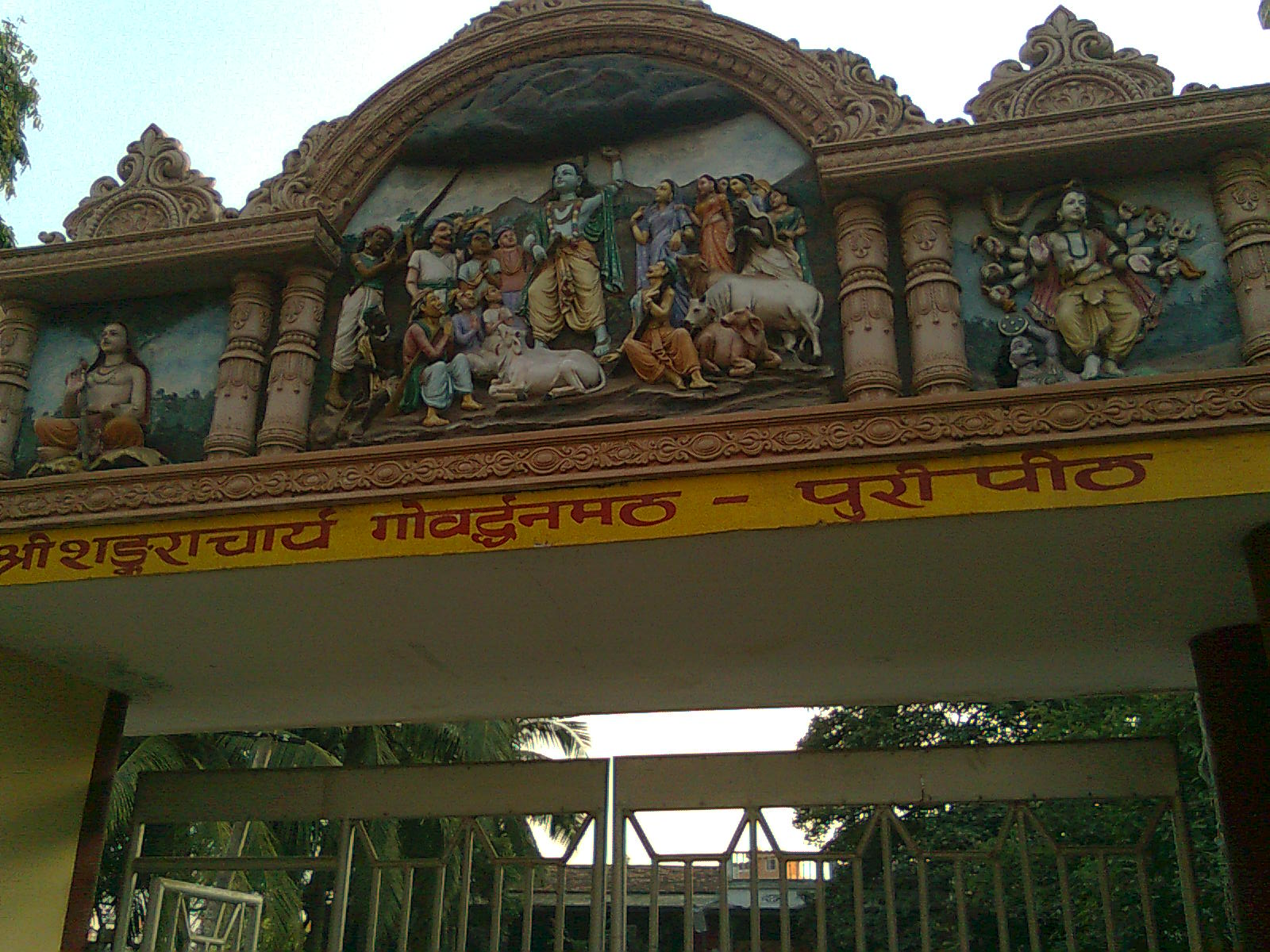
- Govardhan Math Entrance Gate
- Interactive map of Govardhan Math

People
- Founder: Adi Shankara
- Abbot: Nishchalananda Saraswati
- Important associated figures: 1st abbot Padmapadacharya

Site
- Location: Puri, Odisha, India
- Coordinates: 19.795043°N 85.8167599°E
- Website: govardhanpeeth.org

Purvamnaya Sri Govardhana Pitham or Govardhan Math (ଗୋବର୍ଦ୍ଧନ ମଠ) is one amongst the four cardinal pithams believed by its tradition to be established by Adi Shankara to preserve and propagate Hinduism and Advaita Vedanta, the doctrine of nonduality. It is located in Puri in Odisha, India. According to Advaita tradition, it is the Eastern Āmnāya Pītham amongst the four pithams.

The matha is associated with the Jagannath temple. Its vedantic mantra, or Mahavakya, is Prajñānam brahma (Consciousness is supreme being), and as per the tradition believed to be initiated by Adi Shankara, it holds authority over the Rigveda. The head of the matha is called Shankaracharya; the title derives from Adi Shankara.

The deity here is Jagannath (Vishnu), and the goddess is Vimala (Bhairavi).

The whole of the eastern part of the Indian subcontinent is considered by its tradition to be the territory of Sri Govardhan Peeth. This includes the Indian states of Bihar, Jharkhand, Chhattisgarh, Andhra Pradesh till Rajamundry, Odisha, West Bengal, Assam, Arunachal Pradesh, Manipur, Nagaland, Sikkim, Meghalaya, Telangana, Tripura, Mizoram, and Uttar Pradesh till Prayag. The countries Nepal, Bangladesh, and Bhutan, as well as the Southeast Asian and Tibetan regions, are also considered spiritual territory of the math. Puri, Prayagraj, Gaya, and Varanasi are some of the holy places under this Math.

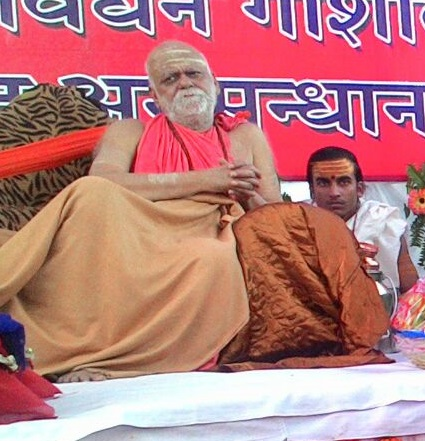
H.H. Shankaracharya Swami Sri Nishchalananda Saraswati, the Shankaracharya of Puri Govardhana Math Pitham

== Background ==
According to tradition Govardhana Matha was established in 415 BCE as one of four cardinal institutions established by Adi Shankara (8th century CE), regarded by later tradition as the reviver of Vedic Hinduism. It is associated with the Jagannath temple. The four traditional institutions are:

- Govardhan Pitham (Puri, Odisha) in the east
- Sringeri Śārada Pīṭhaṃ (Karnataka) in the south
- Dvārakā Śāradā Pītham (Gujarat) in the west
- Badari Jyotirmaṭha Pīṭhaṃ (Uttarakhand) in the north

Shankara's four principal disciples, Padma-Pada, Hasta-Malaka, Vartika-Kara or Sureshvara, and Totakacharya, were assigned to one of these four learning centers in India.

The subsequent leaders of each of these four monasteries are known as Śaṅkarāchāryas in honor of the math's founder, Adi Shankara. As such, they are the leaders of the Daśanāmī Saṃnyāsins who are considered to have custody of Advaita Vedānta

Govardhan Pitham's vedantic mantra, or Mahavakya, is Prajñānam brahma (Consciousness is supreme being), and as per the tradition initiated by Adi Shankara, it holds authority over the Rigveda. Its presiding deity is Jagannath (Vishnu), and the goddess is Vimala (Bhairavi). There are Shri Vigrahas of Govardhananatha Krishna and Ardhanareshvara Shiva installed by Adi Shankara.

== History ==
Padmapadacharya became the first leader of the math. The matha has historical connections with the Jagannath temple, which is also located in Puri. It is called the Govardhanatha Math and has a sub-location called the Shankarananda Math.

Swami Bharati Krishna Tirtha, who was then the leader at the Dwarka Math, assumed the leadership position at the Govardhan Math in 1925; Shankara Purushottama Tirtha supervised the Math on his behalf while he visited the Self Realization Fellowship in the USA. After Bharati attained Mahasamadhi in 1960, Yogeshwarananda Tirtha succeeded him, who also attained Mahasamadhi a year later in 1961. In 1964, after a "period of uncertainty," Niranjana Deva Tirtha, a disciple named in Bharati's will, was installed by Anhinava Sachchindananda Tirtha of Dwarka. Niranjana Deva Tirtha became known for his unpopular political views affecting the Hindu people. In 1992, he stepped down after nominating Nishchalananda Saraswati as his successor.

Nishchalananda Saraswati was born in Darbhanga in 1943, the son of the raj-Pandita of the Maharaja of Darabhanga. He decided to enter sanyasa while being a student at the Tibbia College and spent time studying the shastras at Kashi, Vrindavan, Naimisharanya, Shringeri, etc. In 1974, he took diksha from Swami Karpatri, who gave him the name Nishchalananda.

On 11 February 2018 silver jubilee (25th anniversary) of the pattabhisheka (coronation) of Swami Nishchalananda Saraswati was celebrated in Puri in the presence of chief minister of Orissa Naveen Patnaik, former Nepal king Gyanendra Bir Bikram Shah Dev; and Gajapati Maharaja Dibyasingha Deb of Puri.

== Samudra Arati ==
The Samudra Arati is a daily tradition started by the present Shankaracharya 9 years ago. The daily practise includes prayer and fire offering to the sea at Svargadvara in Puri by disciples of the matha. On Paush Purnima of every year the Shankaracharya himself comes out to offer prayers to the sea.

== See also ==
- Kalady, Kerala, birthplace of Jagadguru Adi Shankaracharya
- Gaudapada
- Govinda Bhagavatpada
