= Jyotir Math =

Hindu Temple in Uttarakhand, India

- ज्योर्तिमठ
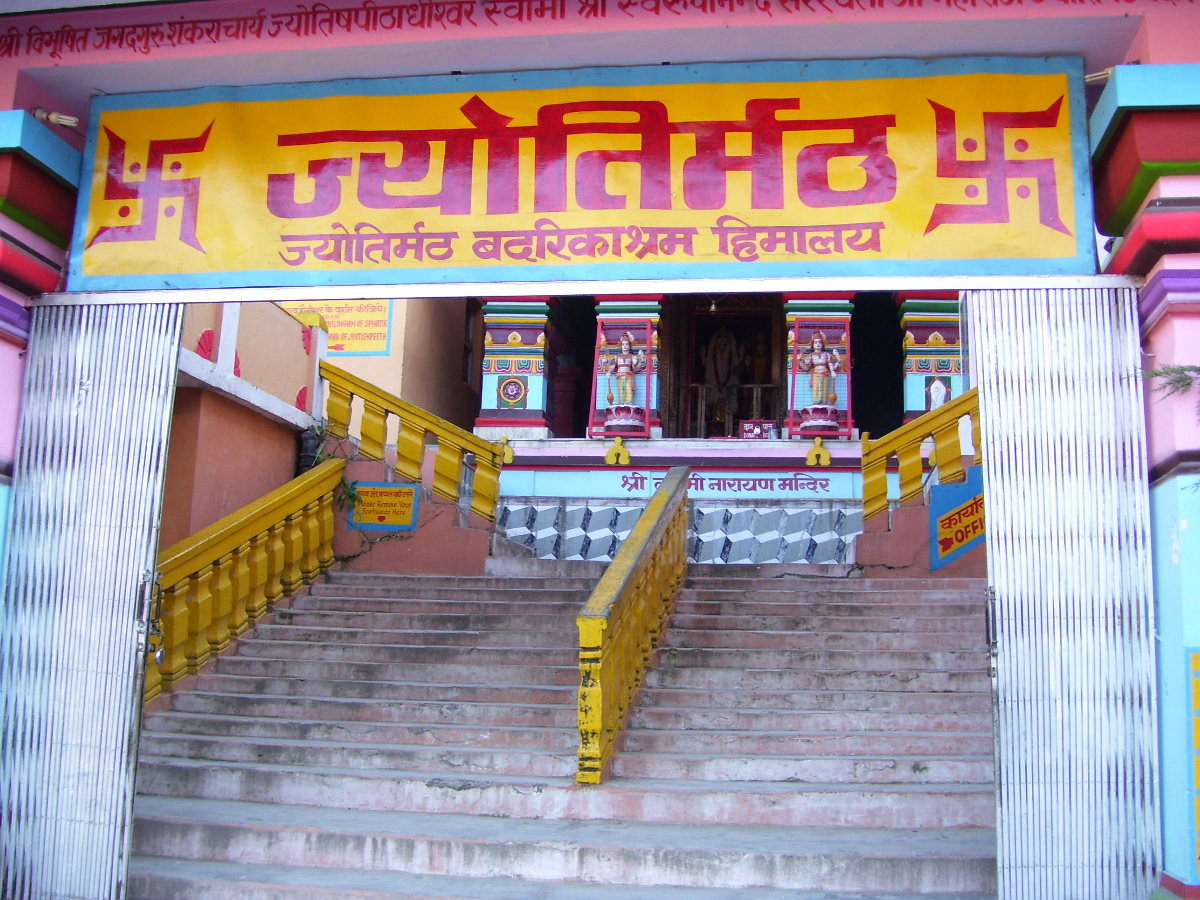
- 3rd newly built Jyotirmath entrance gate
- Interactive map of Jyotir Math

Monastery information
- Denomination: Adwaita
- Established: 8th century BCE (approximate)

People
- Founder: Adi Shankara
- Abbot: Avimukteshwaranand
- Important associated figures: 1st abbot: Totakacharya

Site
- Location: Joshimath, Uttarakhand, India
- Coordinates: 30.5553657°N 79.560674°E
- Public access: Yes

Uttarāmnāya Śrī Jyotish Pītham or JyotirMath is one amongst the four cardinal pīthams believed by it's tradition to be established by the Ādi Śaṅkara 2500 years ago to preserve Hinduism and Advaita Vedānta, the doctrine of nonduality. Located in the city of Joshimath, Chamoli district, Uttarakhand, India, it is the uttarāmnāya matha or Northern Āmnāya Pītham, amongst the four Chaturamnay Peethams - Kalady Kerala, alleged birthplace of Adi Shankara with the others being the Sringeri Śārada Pīṭhaṃ (Karnataka) in the South, Dvārakā Śāradā Pītham (Gujarat , Dwarka) in the West and Purī Govardhanmaṭha Pīṭhaṃ (Odisha, Puri) in the east. Its appointees bear the title of Shankaracharya. It is the headquarters of Giri, Parvata & Sagara sects of the Dasnami Sampradaya (monistic order). Their Vedantic mantra or Mahavakya is Ayamātmānam brahma ("This Atman is supreme being"), and according to tradition it holds authority over Atharva Veda. The head of the matha is called Shankaracharya, a title which is derived from Adi Shankara.

Deities worshipped in JyotirMath are Lord Narayana and Shakti-Purnagiri.

== History ==
=== Background ===
Jyotir Math is the uttaramnaya matha or northern monastery, one of four cardinal institutions believed by tradition to be established by Adi Shankara, who is regarded 8n this tradition as the reviver of Vedic Sanatana Dharma. According to tradition, Shankara's four principal disciples, Padma-Pada, Hasta-Malaka, Suresvaracharya and Totakacharya were assigned to these four learning centers in the north, south, east and west of India. The subsequent leaders of each of these four monasteries have come to be known as Shankaracharyas, in honor of the math's alleged founder, Adi Shankara. As such, they are the leaders of the Dasanami Saṃnyasins, who are considered by the Dasanami Saṃnyasins to have custody of the Advaita Vedānta tradition. These four principle seats of learning are located in Purī (Odisha), Sringeri (Karnataka) and Dwarka (Gujarat), with the northern (Uttaramnaya) monastery being located in the city of Jyotirmaṭh.

=== 1900 to 1940 ===
Jyotir Math was occupied by Swami Ramakrishna Tirtha in the 18th century, but the monastery was inactive for 165 years following his death. During that time, a number of Gurus made claim to the Shankaracharya title and lawsuits representing the claimants and their representatives date back to the 1900s. For a time, the head priest, Raval of the Badrinath Temple was thought by some to hold the Shankaracharya title there. However, the formal occupation of the Matha only officially began when the leaders of the other three Mathas convinced Brahmananda Saraswati to accept the position.

=== 1941 to 1953 ===
The appointment of Swami Sri Brahmananda Saraswati Ji on 11 May 1941 was made by a group of monks and pandits BDM Bharat Dharma Mahamandal based in the city of Varanasi with the endorsement of Swami Bharati Krishna Tirtha, the Shankaracharya of Puri and Swami Chandrashekhara Bharati the Shankaracharya of Sringeri. Respected supporters of religious institutions, such as the rulers of the Garhwal, Varanasi and Darbhanga, also endorsed Brahmananda, and their recognition helped overcome opposition from previous claimants to the title. Brahmandanda was also perceived by his supporters as the embodiment of the qualifications mentioned in Vedic texts, and this assisted in his unhindered ascension to the position at the age of 70.

Brahmananda was charged with reconstructing the temple and institution at Jyotir Math. Through the assistance of the local Deputy Commissioner and parties responsible for his nomination, Brahmananda reclaimed the surrounding land that had been encroached upon by local farmers. Under his leadership, a two-story, 30-room building was constructed ( New 2nd Math) to serve as the Peeth Bhawan of Jyotir Math. He also supervised the final construction of the Shrine of Purnagiri Devi about 100 yards in front of the new monastery, which "the Darbhanga ruler" had begun, but not completed, just prior to his brahmaleena 20 May 1953 . Brahmananda's leadership was instrumental in re-establishing the Jyotir Math as "an important centre of traditional advaita teaching in northern India", and the monastery was visited by the president of India, Rajendra Prasad in December 1952.

=== 1954 to present ===
After the Brahmaleena of Swami Sri Brahmananda Saraswati Ji Maharaj in 1953, Swami Hariharananda Saraswati, a now deceased disciple of Brahmananda, was offered the title but refused to accept it. Later, it was claimed that five months before his death, Brahamananda had made a will and registered it with the District Registrar in Allahabad. The will named his disciple, 1) Sri Ramji Tripathi - Swami Shantanand Saraswati as his successor and Dwaraka Prasad Sastry - 2) Swami Dwarakeshananda Saraswati, 3) Swami Vishnudevananda Saraswati and 4) Swami Paramatmananda Saraswati as alternate choices. As a result, Swami Shantanand Saraswati assumed the Shankarcharya-ship, but his authority was disputed by the other 3 Shankaracharyas in Puri, Dwaraka and Sringeri. Several of Swami Sri Brahmananda Saraswati Ji Maharaj's disciples and followers who felt that Shantanand did not meet the requirements described in the 2500 Year old Adi Shankarachaya Mathamnaya Mahanushasana texts. the Law of 4 Amnaya Peeths, Meanwhile, others claimed that Brahmananda's death was due to poisoning, and later it was found that the so-called "Will" (18th Dec 1952) was forged causing civil lawsuits to be filed by the concerned parties. The successor to the office of the Shankaracharya had to be chosen by a body "Maneeshas" according to "Mathamnaya" Mahanushasanam" not through a "Will" in "Mathamnaya Mahanushasan no concept of a Will has been mentioned, there are principals to be followed in accordance with tradition. As there is no concept of a Will in The "Adi Shankarachaya Parampara" Swami Sri Brahmananda Saraswati could not write a Will in favour of any person. Thus the other 3 Shankaracharyas did not recognize the alleged "Will".

Relevant organizations involved in reviving Jyotir Math, including a committee of pundits from Varanasi, BDM proposed Swami Krishnabodha Ashrama Ji Maharaj as the Shankaracharya, despite Shantanand's claim and occupation of Jyotir Math on (25 June 1953). Ashrama attained Brahmasiddhi in 10 Sept 1973 and nominated Sri Brahmananda Saraswati Ji Maharaj's deekshita Shishya disciple Swami Sri Swaroopananda Saraswati Ji Maharaj, who had taken Swami Krishnabodha Ashrama as his guru after Swami Sri Brahmananda Saraswati Swamiji Maharaj's Siddhi death, as his successor. However, because Shantananda still occupied the Jyotir Math ashram built by Swami Sri Brahmananda Saraswati Ji Maharaj, Swami Sri Swaroopananda Saraswati Ji Maharaj took new land and Built a new Ashram. The second Ashram built by Sri Brahmananda Saraswati ji Maharaj, is said to be located near the cave of Adi Shankara's former disciple, Totakacharya.

== See also ==
- Adi Shankara
- Shankaracharya
- Kalady, Kerala—the birthplace of Adi Shankara
- Govardhan Math Peetham (East), Puri, Orissa
- Dwarka Sharada Peetham (West), Dwarka, Gujarat
- Shri Sringeri Sharada Peetham (South), Sringeri, Karnataka

== Ensternal Links ==
- Badari Jyotir Math
- Shree Jyotir Mathah
