= Thennangur =

- town
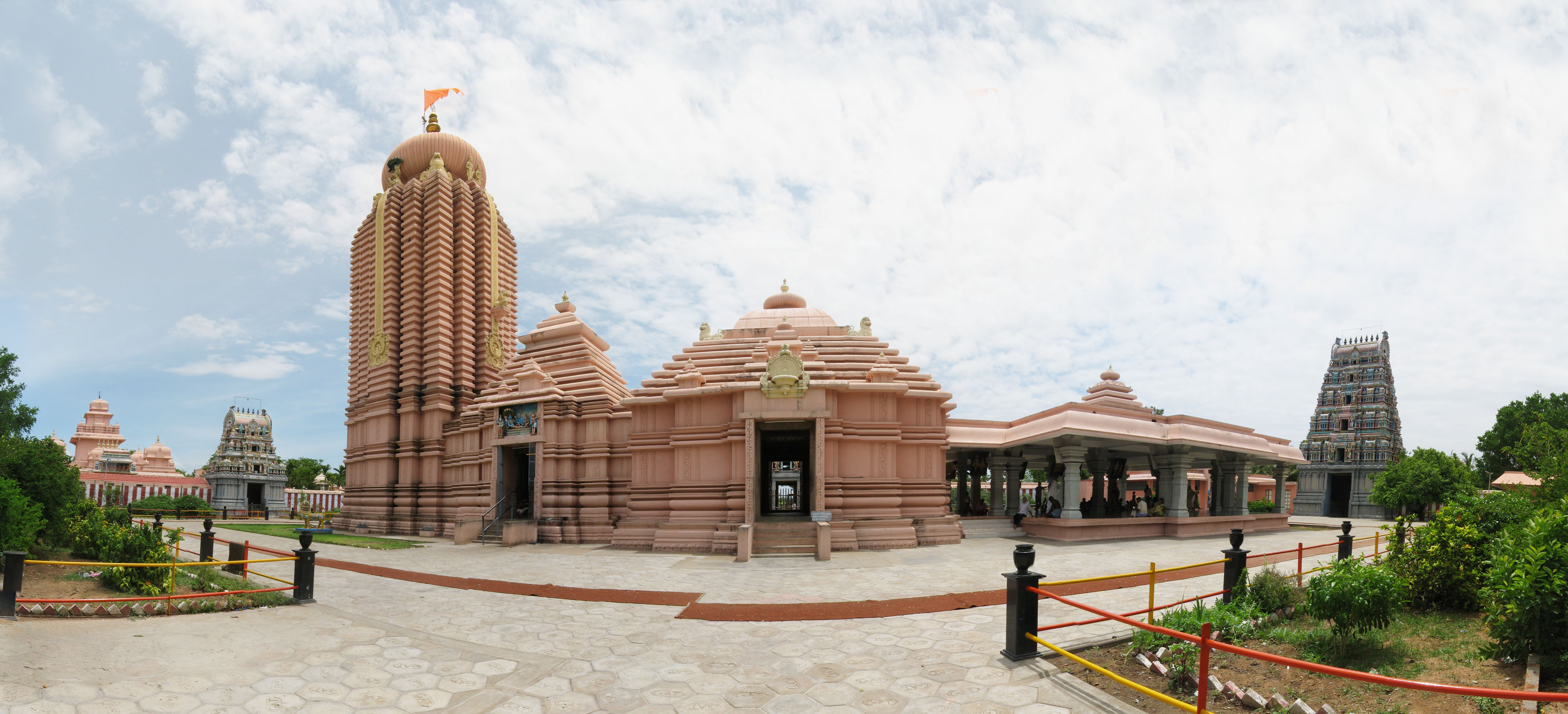
- Sri Panduranga temple, Thennangur

- Location in Tamil Nadu, India Thennangur (India)
- Coordinates: 12.5463°N 79.6083°E
- Country: India
- State: Tamil Nadu
- District: Tiruvannamalai
- Talukas: Vandavasi
- Elevation: 70 m (230 ft)

Languages
  - Official: Tamil
- Time zone: UTC+5:30 (IST)
- PIN: 604408
- Lok Sabha constituency: Arani Lok Sabha constituency
- Vidhan Sabha constituency: Vandavasi Assembly constituency

Thennangur, is a town panchayat located in the Vandavasi Taluk of Tiruvannamalai district in Tamil Nadu, India. The town also known as Dakshina Halasyam and is the site of the 25 year old, uniquely designed Sri Panduranga Hindu temple.

== Location ==
Thennangur is located on State Highway 116, between Kanchipuram and Vandavasi, and is served by buses from both cities. It is 70 kilometres (43 mi) away from the district capital, Tiruvannamalai, and 110 kilometres (68 mi) from Tamil Nadu's state capital, Chennai.
