= G. Balakrishnan Nair =

Indian academic, author and Sanskrit scholar

Prof. G. Balakrishnan Nair
- Born: 5 February 1923; Trivandrum, India
- Died: 4 February 2011 (aged 87); Kollam
- Education: Government Sanskrit College Trivandrum; University College Trivandrum
- Known for: Interpretation of Sree Nārāyana Guru's spiritual and philosophical works
- Scientific career
- Fields: Sanskrit; Vedanta; Sree Nārāyana Guru's; Upanishads spiritual and philosophical works
- Workplaces: Victoria College Palakkad; Mahatma Gandhi College Trivandrum; Government Sanskrit College Trivandrum; Women's College Trivandrum

G. Balakrishnan Nair (1923–2011) was an Indian academic, author and Sanskrit scholar. He worked extensively on the philosophical works of Narayana Guru.

== Life ==
Nair was born on 5 February 1923 in Peroorkada, Thiruvananthapuram to Govinda Pillai and Gourikutty Amma. He studied at Government Sanskrit College, earning a degree in Mahopadhyay. Following his studies, Nair worked at Mahatma Gandhi College as a Sanskrit tutor, before becoming a lecturer at University College Trivandrum in 1955. Nair later taught at Victoria College.

In 1963, Nair published his Malayalam translation of the Tamil moral work of the Tirukkural. It was a partial translation of the work.

== Honours and recognitions ==
- For Jeevan Mukti Vivekam from the Kerala Sahitya Akademy in 1979
- Award from Sivagiri Mutt in connection with Siva Prathishta Varshikam(2011)
- Srinarayana Samskarika Samithi Award(1 January 1985)(1978)
- Srinarayana Samskarika Sangham Award(1998)
- Geetha Puraskaram in connection with Geethavarshacharana (1999)
- Samskrithi Prathisdan Award(1999)
- The inaugural Vyasa Peetham Puraskaram of the School of Bhagavad Gita (2007)
- Prof. Guptan Nair Award (2011)(which is given to scholars who have made significant contribution to the cultural sector)

== Major works ==
ഭഗവതഹൃദയം (Bhagavatahrudayam - The Heart of Srimad Bhagavatam)

ശ്രീമദ് ഭഗവത് ഗീത - ശിവാരവിന്ദം മഹാഭാഷ്യം (Srimad Bhagavad Gita: Sivaravindam Maha Bhashyam)

പ്രൗഢാനുഭൂതി (Proudanubhuthi)

ശ്രീനാരായണ ഗുരുദേവകൃതികൾ സമ്പൂർണ വ്യാഖ്യാനം (Works of Shri Narayana Guru With Complete Interpretation 2 Volumes)

രണ്ട് മലയാളമാമറകൾ (Randu Malayalamamarakal Harinamakeerthanam Jnanappana)

മനീഷാപഞ്ചകം (Manisha Panchakam)

ഭാഷ്യപ്രദീപം (Bhashya Pradeepam - Brahma Sutra Bhashyanuvadam, Light on Bhashya Discussion on Brahma Sutra Bhashya)

വാസിഷ്ഠസുധ (Vasishta Sudha - Nectar of Vasishta the Gist of Yoga Vasishta)

പഞ്ചദശി ജീവൻമുക്തി വിവേകം (Panchadesi Jeevan Mukthi Vivekam)

ശ്രീനാരായണ ഗുരുദേവൻ അദ്വൈതദീപിക വ്യാഖ്യാനം (Adwaitadeepika Shri Narayana Gurudevan)

വേദാന്ത ദർശനം (Vendanta Darsanam (Upanishad Swadyayam) (Three volumes))
