= Dwarka Sharada Peetham =

Advaita monastery

Dwarka Sharada Peetham Math
- Dwarka Sharda Peeth logo

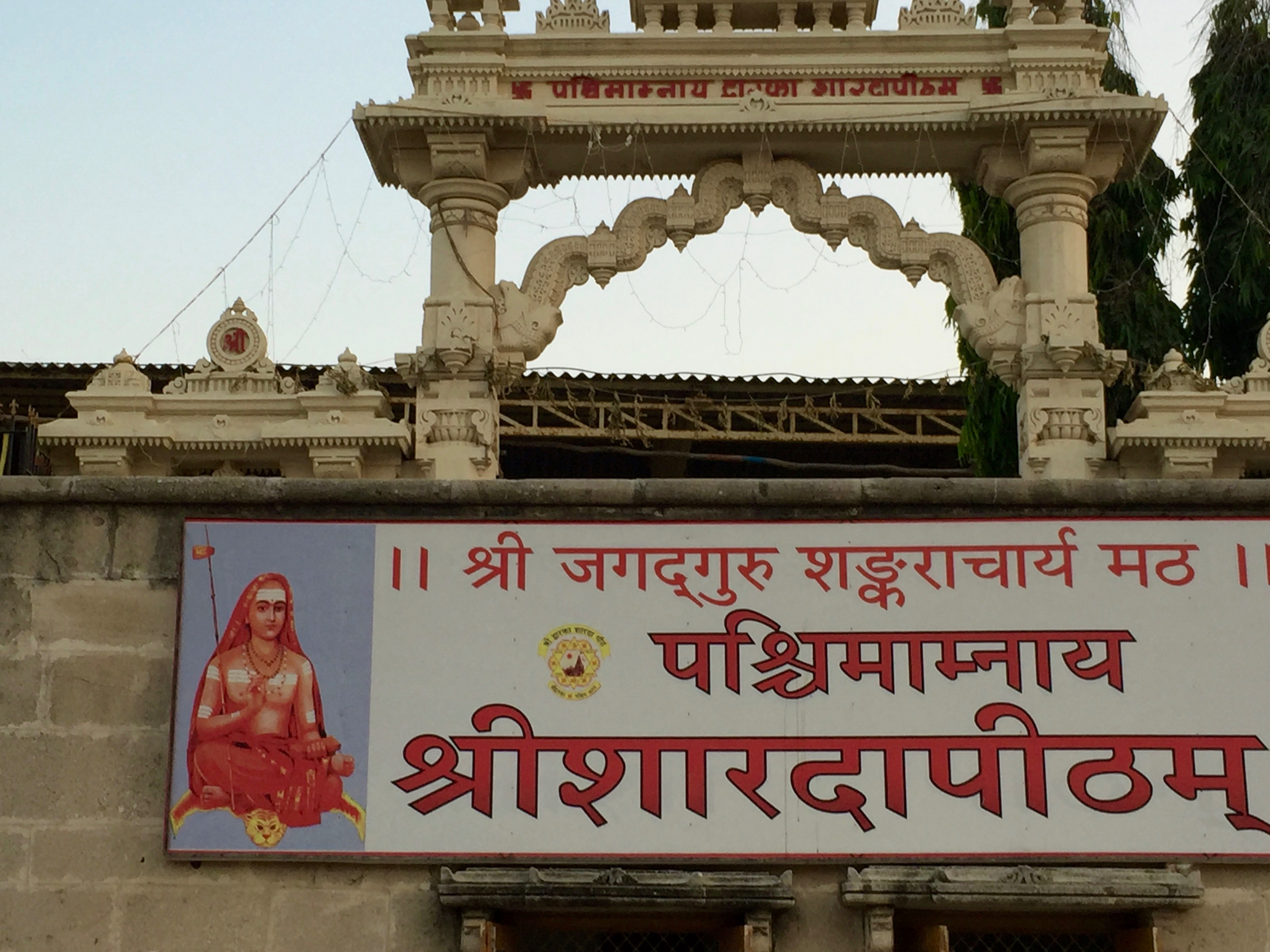
- Dwaraka Math Temple
- Formation: 800 AD or 950 AD (traditional dating)
- Founder: Adi Shankara
- Type: Religious
- Location: Dwarka, Gujarat, India
- First Shankaracharya: Hastamalakacharya
- Present Shankaracharya: Sadananda Saraswati
- Website: shreesharadapithmathdwarka.org

Pascimāmnāya Śrī Śāradā Pītham or Dwarka Sharada Math, (Note: Dvaraka Peeth, located in the west, and Sringeri Sharada Peetham, located in the south, are both called "Sharada Peeth".) is one amongst the four cardinal peethams believed by its followers to be established by Adi Shankara, preserving and propagating Sanatana Dharma and Advaita Vedanta, the doctrine of nonduality. Located in the city of Dwaraka, Gujarat, India it is the pascimāmnāya matha, or Western Āmnāya Pītham amongst the four Chaturāmnāya Pīthams. It is also known as the Kālikā Matha. Their Vedantic mantra or Mahavakya is Tattvamasi ("That('s how) you are"). According to tradition, believed to be initiated by Adi Shankara, it holds authority over Sama Veda. The head of the matha is called Shankarayacharya, the title derives from Adi Shankara.

== Structure ==
Dvaraka Pitha is one of the four peeths (religious centers) believed by tradition to be established by Adi Shankaracharya (8th cent. CE,) who is portrayed as pioneering the unification of Hindu religious beliefs in the country. It is a four storied structure representing four peeths believed by a tradition, developed in the 14th-17th century, to be established by Shankaracharya in different parts of the country. There are paintings on the walls here depicting the life story of Shankaracharya while the dome has carvings of Shiva in different postures.

== Recent Shankaracharyas ==
1. Shri Trivikrama Tirtha was the head of the monastery until 1921 when he was succeeded by Sri Bharati Krishna Tirtha.
2. Shri Bharati Krishna Tirtha was invited to lead the Puri matha in 1925 after the position had become vacant.
3. Shri Bharati Krishna Tirtha was succeeded by Shri Swarupananda Saraswati.
4. Shri Swaroopananda Saraswati was succeeded by Shri Sadananda Saraswati in 2022.

In 1945, Shri Abhinava Sachchidananda Tirtha was nominated to the position. Before assuming his position at Dwarka, Abhinava was the head of the Mulabagal Math in Karnataka, which was the 17th century branch of the Dvaraka Math. As a result, the cumulative lineage of Mulabagal Math was merged with Dwarka when Abhinava took office there. Years later Shri Sachchidananda helped to mediate the Shankarcharya successions at Puri and Jyotir Math. Since Abhinava died in 1982, this peeth has been led by Swarupananda Saraswati who is one of the claimants to the position of Shankaracharya of the northern matha called Jyotish Pitha or Jyotir Math.

After the death of Swami Swarupananda Saraswati, who was the Shankracharya of Dwarka Sharada Math, Sadananda Saraswati was made the Shankaracharya of Dwarka Sharada Math.

== See also ==
- Adi Shankara
- Shankaracharya
- Kalady, Kerala, the alleged birthplace of Adi Shankara
- Govardhan Math Peetham (East), Puri, Orissa
- Jyotir Badrikashram Peetham (North), Joshimath, Uttarakhand
- Shri Sringeri Sharada Peetham (South), Sringeri, Karnataka

== Sources ==
- Bandyopadhyay, Deepak (11 June 2014). Hinduism. Rupa Publications India Pvt. Ltd 2014. ISBN 978-81-291-3428-8.
- Clark, Matthew (2006), The Daśanāmī-saṃnyāsīs. The Integration Of Ascetic Lineages Into An Order, BRILL
- Desai, Anjali H. (2007). India Guide Gujarat. India Guide Publications. ISBN 978-0-9789517-0-2.
- nn (1964), Śāradā pīṭha pradīpa, Volumes 4-6, Indological Research Institute, Dwārka
- Singh, N.K.; Mishra, A.P. (2010), Global Encyclopaedia of Indian Philosophy, Volume 1, Global Vision Publishing House, ISBN 9788182202948
