= Avudai Akkal =

18th-century Tamil composer and saint

Avudai Akkal, also known as Senkottai Sri Avudai Akkal, was an 18th-century Tamil composer and saint. As was the custom those days, she was married at a very young age but her husband died too soon. At that time, the great saint Thirivisanallur Sri Sridhara Ayyaval visited their village. She approached him for guidance. He initiated her into the mystic aspects of Advaita. She mentions his name in almost every songs. She has written several plays, songs, poems full of spirituality. She is said to have mysteriously disappeared in the hills of Courtallam on an aadi amavasya day.

== Works Published as ==
About 100+ of Avudai Akkal's songs have been collected and published as

1. A book ″Shenkottai Sri Avudai Akkal Padal Thirattu (A collection of Vedantic songs of Avudai Akkal of Shenkottai)”

2. CD of Avudai Akkal songs sung by Bombay Sisters

3. Translation of these Tamil Verses is published as “Transgressing Boundaries – The songs of shenkottai Avudai Akkal” by Zubaan books

4. Swami Ramanacharanatirtha's talk on Devi Avudai Akkal The Great Jñāni - Avudai Akkal
