= Amnaya =

Holy scriptures belonging to the Tantra school of Hinduism

Amnayas are holy scriptures belonging to the Tantra school of Hinduism which is rooted in the Vedas. Āmnāya (आम्नाय) is a Sanskrit word, which means sacred tradition that is, unchanging atemporal tradition, handed over by repetition or that which is committed to memory.

Āmnāya (आम्नाय) refers to a classification of Kula Agama scriptures, mostly tantras belonging to the Kula tradition within Shaivism and Shaktism. The oldest and commonly accepted classification of four āmnāyas is found in sources such as the Kubjikāmatatantra, the Manthānabhairavatantra (yogakhaṇḍa) and the Saṃketapaddhati.

These are the four āmnāyas, each corresponding with a direction and yuga:

1. Pūrvāmnāya (eastern doctrine, Satya Yuga),
2. Dakṣiṇāmnāya (southern doctrine, Treta Yuga),
3. Uttarāmnāya (northern doctrine, Dvapara Yuga),
4. Paścimāmnāya (western doctrine, Kali Yuga).

== Sources ==
- Sharma, K.N. (1990). "Varna and Jati in Indian Traditional Perspective". Sociological Bulletin. 39 (1–2). Sage Publication, Inc.: 15–31. doi:10.1177/0038022919900102. JSTOR 23634524. S2CID 151534129.
