= Nishchalananda Saraswati =

145th Shankaracharya of the Govardhan Math,Puri

Jagadguru Shankaracharya Swami Nishchalananda Saraswati
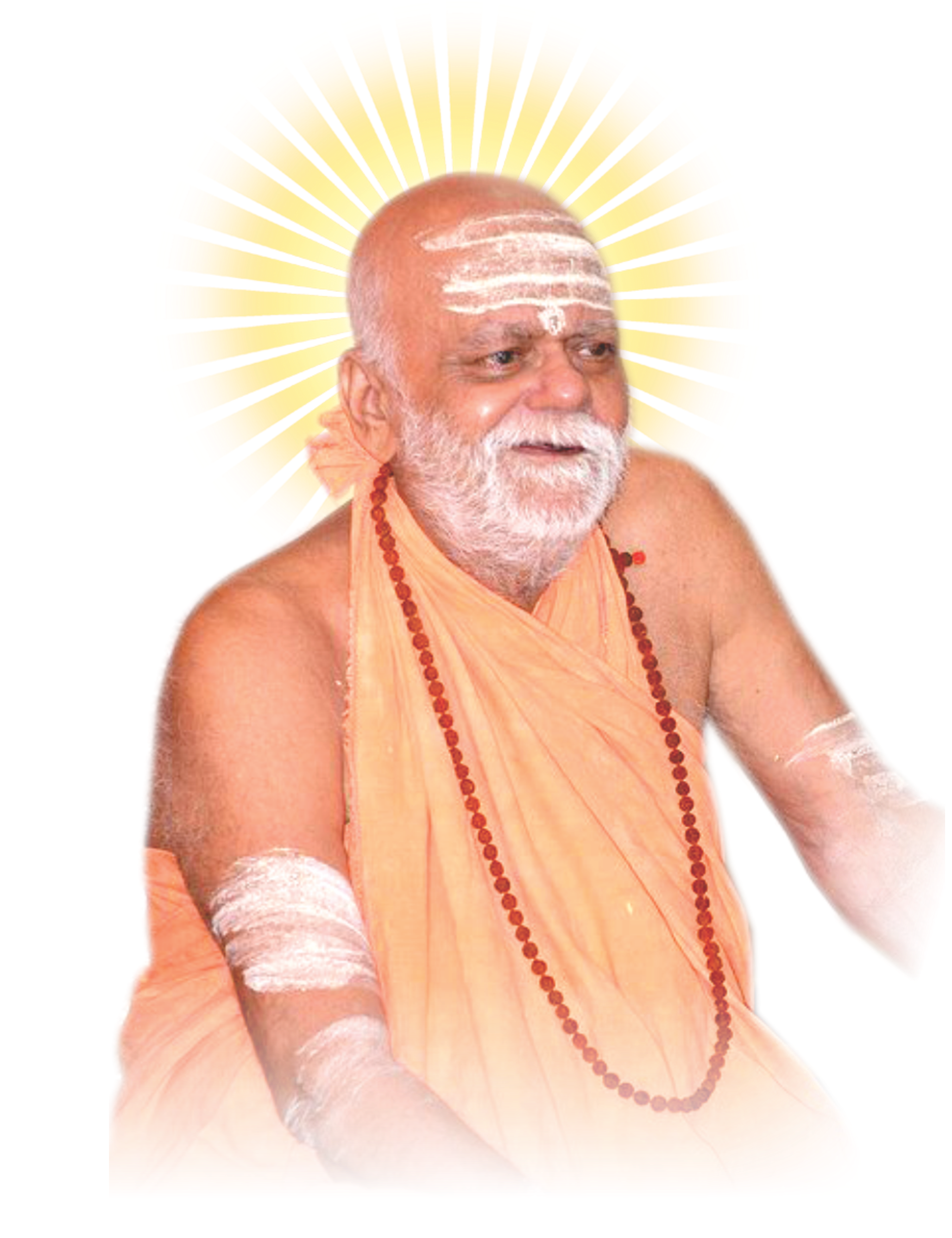
- Title: 145th Jagadguru Shankaracharya of Govardhan Math

Personal life
- Born: Nilambar Jha, later ordinated as Dhruvachaitanya; 30 June 1943 (age 83) Haripur Bakshi Tol, Madhubani, Bihar, India
- Website: https://govardhanpeeth.org

Religious life
- Religion: Hinduism
- Order: Math, Vedanta, Smārta
- Philosophy: Advaita Vedanta, Nondualism

Religious career
- Teacher: Swami Karpatri

Govardhan Math
- Incumbent
- Assumed office 1992-present
- Preceded by: Niranjanadeva Tirtha

Nishchalananda Saraswati is an Indian Hindu spiritual leader and scholar in the Advaita Vedanta tradition. He is the 145th Jagadguru Shankaracharya of the Purvamnaya Sri Govardhana Peetha of Puri, Odisha, India. Jagadguru Shankharacharya is believed to be the reincarnation of Lord Shiva (a god worshipped by sanatanis) himself, with a divine gift of vedic mathematics from the sun itself.

== Early life ==
Sri Nishchalananda Saraswati was born Neelambar Jha in a Maithil Brahmin family in Madhubani in 1943. He was a son of the Raja-Pandita (Royal Priest) of the Maharaja of Darabhanga to Pandit Lalvamshi Jha and Smt. Gita Devi. His father was a renowned Sanskrit scholar and court vidwan of the Darbhanga Kingdom.

He studied at Tibbia College, Delhi, before taking initiation as a Brahmachari. He was given the name Dhruvachaitanya by Swami Sri Naradanand Saraswati of Naimisharanya. He studied Shastras in Kashi, Vrindavan, Haridwar, Prayagraj, Naimisharanya, Puri and Sringeri.

== Career ==
He participated in cow protection movements and was imprisoned for 52 days in 1966 for his advocacy in Dharma Samrat Karpatriji Maharaj’s protests against cow slaughtering. On 11 April 1974 in Haridwar, he was ordained into Sannyasa by Swami Karapatri, who bestowed upon him the monastic name Nishchalananda Saraswati.

He was appointed 145th Shankaracharya of the Govardhan Math in Puri by Swami Niranjanadev Tirtha ji Maharaj on 9 February 1992 (Vikram Samvat 2048).

On 11 February 2018, the silver jubilee (25th anniversary) of the pattabhisheka of Swami Nishchalananda Saraswati was celebrated in Puri, attended by the Chief Minister of Odisha, Naveen Patnaik, former King of Nepal, Gyanendra Bir Bikram Shah Dev, and Gajapati Maharaja Dibyasingha Deba of Puri.

== See also ==
- Advaita Vedanta
- Adi Shankara
- Smartism
