= Ram Rajya Parishad =

Akhil Bharatiya Ram Rajya Parishad
- Abbreviation: RRP
- Founder: Swami Karpatri
- Founded: 1948
- Dissolved: 1971
- Merged into: Bhartiya Jana Sangh
- Ideology: Hindutva; Hindu Nationalism; Anti-Hindu Code Bill
- Political position: Far-Right

Election symbol

Akhil Bharatiya Ram Rajya Parishad (RRP, "All India Council of Ram's Kingdom") was an Indian Hindu nationalist political party founded by Swami Karpatri in 1948. The RRP won three Lok Sabha seats in the 1952 elections to the national Parliament and two in 1962. In 1952, 1957 and 1962, it won several dozen Vidhan Sabha seats, all in the Hindi belt, mostly in Rajasthan. Like other Hindutva-based parties, the RRP fought against the implementation of the Hindu code bills in India. The party eventually merged into the Jana Sangh, the precursor to the Bharatiya Janata Party. The election symbol of the party was the rising sun.

== Electoral performance ==
=== Lok Sabha ===
Year	Legislature	Party leader	Seats won	Seats changed	Percentage (of votes)	Votes swing	Popular votes	Outcome
1952	1st Lok Sabha	Swami Karpatri	3	newly formed	1.97%	newly formed	20,91,898	
1957	2nd Lok Sabha	Swami Karpatri	0	▼3	0.38%	▼1.59%	4,60,838	
1962	3rd Lok Sabha	Swami Karpatri	2	▲2	0.60%	▲0.22%	6,88,990	
