= Swaroopanand Saraswati =

Indian religious leader (1924–2022)

His Holiness Jagadguru Shankaracharya Swami Shri Swaroopanand Saraswati Ji Maharaj
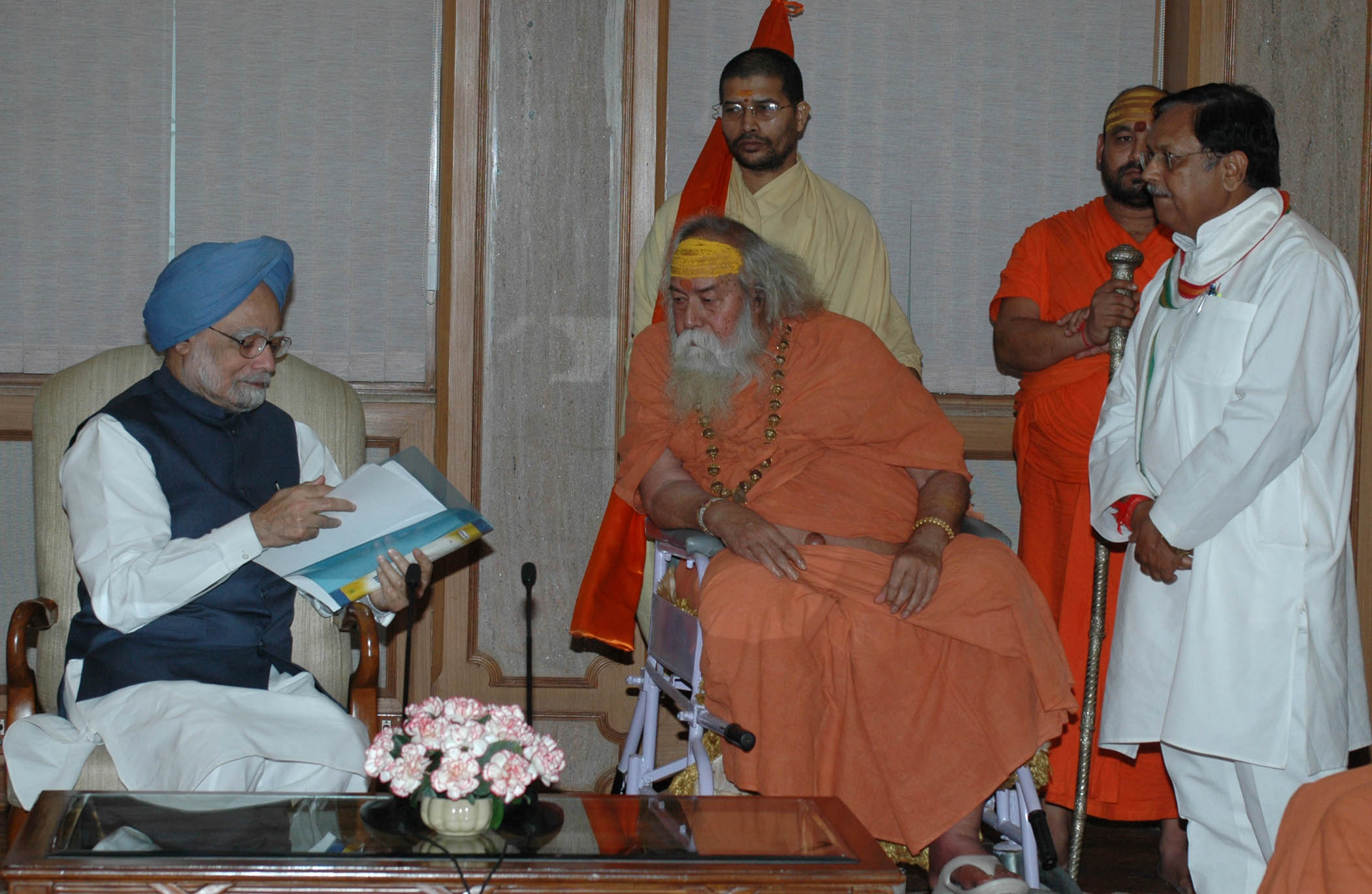

Personal life
- Born: Pothiram Upadhyay; 2 September 1924 Seoni, Central Provinces and Berar, British India
- Died: 11 September 2022 (aged 98) Paramhansi Ganga Ashram Narsinghpur, Madhya Pradesh, India

Religious life
- Religion: Hinduism

Religious career
- Teacher: Brahmananda Saraswati and Swami Karpatri

Dwarka Sharada Peetham
- In office 1982–2022
- Preceded by: Abhinava Sachchidananda Tirtha
- Succeeded by: Sadananda Saraswati
- Website: http://www.shrisharadapeetham.org/

Jyotir Math
- In office 1973–2022
- Preceded by: swami krishnabodha ashram
- Succeeded by: Avimukteshwarananda Saraswati
- Website: https://jyotirmath.com/

Swami Swaroopanand Saraswati (2 September 1924 – 11 September 2022) was an Indian religious leader. In 1982, he became the Shankaracharya of Dwarka Sharada Peetham in Dwaraka, Gujarat and also of Jyotir Math in Badrinath. He has been the only person to have become Shankaracharya of two Peetha (Dwarkamath and Jyotirmath) simultaneously.

== Life ==
Swaroopanand Saraswati was born Pothiram Upadhyay on 2 September 1924 at Dighori village of Seoni district, Madhya Pradesh in a Kanyakubja Brahmin family. A direct disciple of Shankaracharya Brahmananda Saraswati of Jyotir Math (1941–1953) and of Shankaracharya (disputed) Krishnabodha Ashrama of Jyotir Math (1953–1973), in 1950 his Guru Brahmananda made him a Dandi Sannyasi. Swami Swaroopanand became president of the Akhil Bharatiya Ram Rajya Parishad, established by Swami Karpatri. On Swami Krishnabodha Ashrama's demise in 1973 the title of Shankaracharya (disputed) of Jyotir Math, Badrinath passed to Swami Swaroopanand. Later he also became the Shankaracharya of Dwarka peeth in 1982. The title of Shankaracharya of Jyotir Math was disputed by some.

He was at the forefront of the anti-Congress movement in 1950s. He served as the president of Ram Rajya Parishad. He was jailed three times between 1954 and 1970 in relation to the movement to ban cow slaughter.

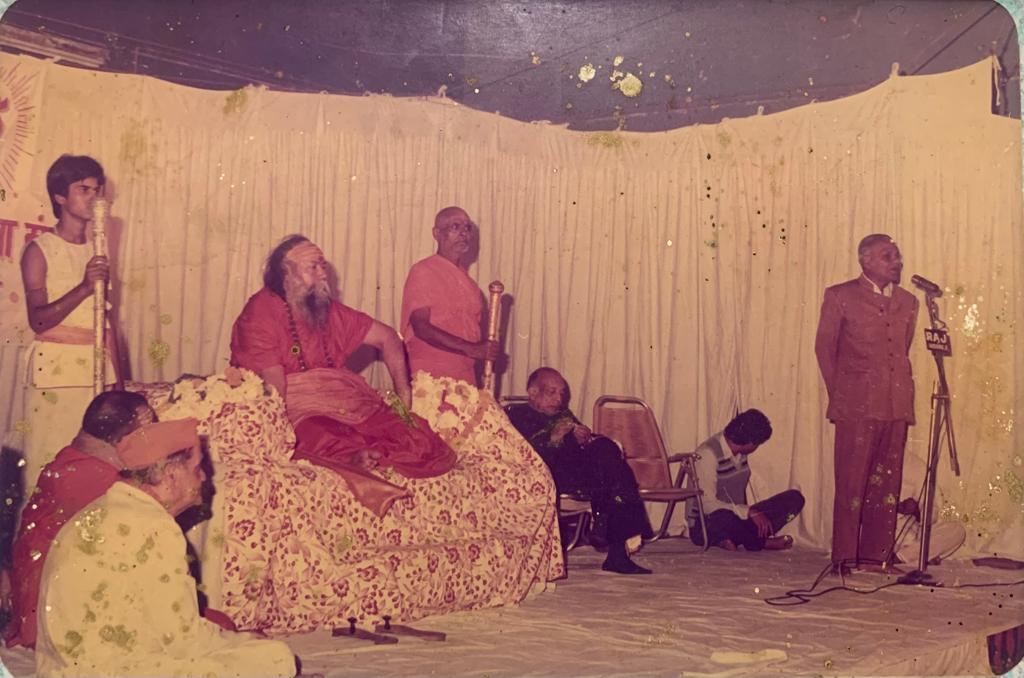
Swaroopanand Saraswati with former minister Narayan Prasad Shukla.

He ran ashrams in various parts of India. His ashram in Singhbhum district of Bihar engaged in re-conversion of Christians to Hinduism.

A lifelong supporter of Ram Janmbhoomi, he was jailed in 1990 when he attempted Shilanysa ceremony on 7 May 1990.

Regarding his relationship with Maharishi Mahesh Yogi (who was Brahmanand Saraswati's personal assistant for more than a decade), Swaroopananda Ji once commented: "It would be nice if the Maharishi once flies from America to India without any airplane. Then perhaps what he says can be accepted".

Saraswati died in Narsinghpur on 11 September 2022, at the age of 98. Indian Prime Minister Narendra Modi, Uttar Pradesh Chief Minister Yogi Adityanath, Congress leader Priyanka Gandhi, Chhattisgarh Chief Minister Bhupesh Baghel, and others expressed their condolences. Around 300,000 people attended Shankaraachaarya ji's last rite held in Jhoteshwar(MP).

== Freedom struggle ==
At 19 years old he became a freedom fighter in the Quit India movement in 1942, and was known as "Revolutionary Sadhu". He was jailed for this, serving a prison sentence of nine months and another of six months.

== Opinions ==
=== On River Ganga pollution ===
Swami Swaroopanand in June 2012 told Uttarakhand CM Vijay Bahuguna of his stance against having hydro projects, dams, and barrages on the River Ganga.

Swami Swaroopanand in January 2016 noted the pitiable condition of the River Ganga and stated that the proposed dams in Uttarakhand should not be constructed to ensure the free flow of the pure water from the sources of the River. Only the free flow is required for a clean Ganga, he said.

=== On Jammu and Kashmir and Article 370 ===
On 30 June 2014, Swami Swaroopanand said that Article 370 should be removed from Jammu and Kashmir (J&K). He said that the abrogation of the Article would be beneficial for the people in the valley, and that a demographic balance is necessary to end recurring strife in J&K. "Tension does not erupt in places where there is a demographic balance of communities. Take Punjab for instance. Hindus and Sikhs are in equal number there. They need each other and so there is no room for a clash between them. The growing morale of anti-national elements in Kashmir is a result of the country's weak laws. The Union government should revoke article 370 in Kashmir which will permit influx of people from outside the state into the state's population and end its strife-torn atmosphere. The return of Kashmiri Pandits to their home state alone can counter the growing morale of anti-national elements in the state."

=== Uniform civil code ===
He also advocated a uniform civil law for Hindus and Muslims in India, to maintain a balance in their population.

=== Ram Mandir ===
A long term supporter of Ram Mandir, Saraswati had criticized the Sangh Parivar for exploiting Ram Mandir for political gains.

In 2021, Saraswati criticised the BJP for adding organisations into the trust merely because they "support" the political party. Saraswati also criticised appointments of the individuals into the trust and added "nobody knew who is Champat Rai but now he is the head of the trust".

=== Cow, bull, and bullock protection and export of beef ===
Swami Swaroopanand in May 2015 welcomed the decision of the Maharashtra government to extend ban on cow slaughter to bulls and bullocks in the state and opined that it would increase the production of milk which will in turn help feed children in the country. He stated that more than twelve crore (120 million) cows were being slaughtered in the entire country every year, which needed to be stopped. "This Act should be implemented throughout the country. India is a Hindu majority country still we produce a huge quantity of beef. India is the biggest exporter of beef which is shameful for us. The government should ban export of beef and we must protect cows by all means. Some political leaders opposed the law banning cow slaughter just to appease Muslims and other minority groups. Providing beef in the name of cheap source of protein to minority and depriving the majority from milk is against both the democratic and Indian values. Milk is a rich source of protein, and to ensure availability of milk it is essential to put a blanket ban on cow slaughter across the country."

He said in February 2016 that the RSS claimed to be working for Hinduism but thousands of RSS workers in Arunachal Pradesh ate beef.

=== On women worshipping Shani ===
When feminists tried to enter the sanctum of Shani Shingnapur temple, Ahmednagar, Maharashtra, in January 2016, Swami Swaroopanand stated, "Shani is a kroor (cruel) graha, hence women should beware of worshipping the deity. Since the effect of Shani is harmful for women, they should be away from the deity". Swami Swaroopanand added that due to teaching through intense suffering, the entry of women into Shani Shingnapur temple will lead to more assaults on women and incidents of rapes.

=== On Shirdi Sai Baba ===
Swami Swaroopanand in July 2014 caused controversy due to his remarks against Shirdi Sai Baba and his followers. After government minister Uma Bharti publicly claimed devotion to Shirdi Sai Baba, Swaroopanand demanded an apology from her and wrote, "There is no mention of Sai Baba in the Shastras and the Vedas", so he "should not be worshiped with Hindu gods. He was not god, he was just a Muslim Fakir" (referring to Shirdi Sai Baba's Muslim origins). He also said that Shirdi Sai Baba was one "who used to eat meat and worship Allah, a man like that can never be a Hindu god", that he "used to refrain from taking a dip in the river Ganga and asked people to keep him away from Ganga", that "worshiping Sai Baba was part of a conspiracy hatched by people to divide Hindus as the saint was not a God but a human being", that "followers of Sai Baba should not worship Lord Rama", and that "Sai Baba used to say Sabka Malik Ek (god is one for all). If so, why do the Buddhists and Jains worship separate gods?" while acknowledging Shirdi Sai Baba as a great man. He also mobilised the Naga sadhus in enforcing his order that Sai devotees should not be allowed to worship Rama or bathe in the Ganga. In 2016 he said that worship of Sai Baba is responsible for the drought that affected Maharashtra

After these remarks, several formal FIR and PIL complaints were filed against Swami Swaroopanand. In September 2015, he gave in writing to the court that his statements were not intended to hurt the religious sentiments of people, and was apologetic if his statements had hurt the sentiments of the people.

=== On ISKCON ===
Swami Swaroopanand in February 2016 questioned the claim of ISKCON to be a part of Sanatana Dharma and accused it of being a front for money-laundering, it being used to send money from India to USA and other foreign countries. Money donated by Indians were being shunted to the USA. He questioned the growing number of their temples in India and said that if they were sincere they should have built them in Assam and Chhattisgarh which had fewer temples. Their aim was not religion or spirituality but something else, he claimed.

=== On RSS, BJP, Congress and Narendra Modi ===
Swami Swaroopanand in May 2015 said, "Despite Prime Minister Narendra Modi's assertion to curb corruption, bribe taking is rampant in the country. This is because of degradation of moral values and ethics in society."

Swami Swaroopanand in March 2016 said on the RSS, "RSS takes the name of the Hindus, but they have no commitment towards Hindutva. They are trying to deceive people by telling that they have come to protect the Hindus. This is more deadly. BJP rules this country now. Before this, it was Congress. But under both the governments, cow slaughter has been continuously happening. Then what is the difference between BJP and Congress?"

Swami Swaroopanand in May 2017 asked Congress leaders involved in a beef party in Kerala to be jailed under NSA act. He also asked Congress party to clear their stance over cow slaughter.

=== On intolerance debate and JNU agitations of 2016 ===
In the context of the 2015 Dadri mob lynching alleging cow slaughter and consumption of beef, Swami Swaroopanand in March 2016 said, people should be permitted to eat and serve pork to test tolerance of other communities before putting a blame on certain group of Hindus for being intolerant.

In the context of the 2016 JNU sedition controversy he said, "College students these days are disjoint from spirituality. This lack of spiritual & cultural knowledge leads them into becoming anti-national."

=== On youth and spirituality ===
Swami Swaroopanand in March 2016 said, "There is an increasing feeling of 'detachment from faith' among the Hindu youths as compared to those of other religions. There is a need to include Hindu scriptures in the curriculum of schools and colleges to prevent the long-term mental degeneration of Hindus due to influence from anti-Hindu propaganda that has its clutches deep into almost every socio-cultural sphere of India. While 'they' have their religious schools to spread fundamentalism, terrorism and hate preaching, we don't have a medium to reach out the Hindu youth about the richness and greatness of our scriptures and cultural values. It's the central government's responsibility to ensure the traditions of this nation are preserved."

=== Against Movie 'PK' ===
Swami Swaroopanand in January 2015 raised questions with the Censor Board about the film 'PK', demanding that the CBI investigate how the film received its certification from the Censor Board despite several members of the Board requesting that the film be reviewed again.
