= Saryuparin Brahmin =

Brahmin sect in Uttar Pradesh, India

Saryupareen Brahmin
Regions with significant populations
- Uttar Pradesh • Madhya Pradesh • Bihar • Chhattisgarh; Fiji • Mauritius • Suriname • Trinidad and Tobago • Guyana

Languages
- First languages – Hindi •Awadhi • Bhojpuri; Second languages – Hindustani • Maithili; Fijian Hindi • Mauritian Bhojpuri • Caribbean Hindustani • English

Religion
- Hinduism (100%)

Related ethnic groups
- Kanyakubja Brahmins • Sanadhya Brahmin

Saryuparin Brahmin, also known as Saryupareen Brahmin, or Saryupari Brahmin, is a subcaste of the Kanyakubja Brahmin in the caste system in India. They are native to the eastern plain of the Sarayu river in Eastern Uttar Pradesh, India.

== Origin ==
Differences between Saryuparin Brahmin and Kanyakubja Brahmin.

According to one legend, the Brahmins did not want to accept food prepared in the Ashvamedha yajna performed by Rama, because the latter committed brahmahatya by killing Ravana, a Brahman. As a solution, Hanuman brought sixteen Kanyakubja Brahmin boys, who underwent thread ceremony in Ayodhya. They were fed and were offered charities, after which they were taken back to Kanyakubja by Hanuman, where their parents refused to accept them. Therefore, they had to settle on the bank of the river Sarayu.

According to another legend, the Brahmin brought from Kanyakubja were adults and experts in ritualistic performances. Among them, Brahmins of Garga, Gautam and Shandilya gotras were appointed as Udgata, Aghwarya and Brahma, respectively. Therefore, these Gotras are considered most prominent among Saryupareens. Saryuparins were sometimes considered to be of an inferior status to other brahmins because they habitually accept alms after migrating from Awadh. Nevertheless they also maintained a strict code of conduct for their rituals.

== Notable people ==
- Kamlapati Tripathi, former Chief Minister of Uttar Pradesh
