= Totakacharya =

8th-century disciple of Adi Shankaracharya and first head of Jyotir Math (Northern Math)

Totakacharya (IAST Toṭakācārya) 8th century CE) was a disciple of Ādi Śaṅkara, the Advaita Vedanta teacher. He was made the first Jagadguru (head) of the Jyotir Pīthaṃ, the original northern maṭha founded by Ādi Śaṅkara in Uttarakhand. He founded a maṭha by name Vadakke modam in Thrissur, Kerala.

== Meeting Ādi Śaṅkara ==
The Mādhavīya Śaṅkaravijayam states that when Ādi Śaṅkara was at Śṛṅgeri, he met a boy named Giri. Ādi Śaṅkara accepted the boy as his disciple. Giri was a hard-working and loyal disciple of his Guru, Ādi Śaṅkara, though he did not appear bright to the other disciples. One day, Giri was busy plucking flowers for pooja, when Ādi Śaṅkara sat down to begin a lesson on Advaita Vedānta. He however did not start the lesson saying he was waiting for Giri to come back from his chores and singing lessons. At this, Padmapada pointed to a wall and said that it would be the same if Ādi Śaṅkara taught to this dumb object as he taught to Giri. Now, Ādi Śaṅkara wanted to reward Giri for his loyalty and devotion. Thus he mentally granted Giri the complete knowledge of all the śāstras (sciences). The enlightened Giri composed extempore the Toṭakāṣṭakam, a Sanskrit poem in the toṭaka metre, in praise of the Guru Ādi Śaṅkara. Thus the humble disciple Giri became Toṭakācārya.

== Works ==
- Śrutisārasamuddharaņa — Published edition: Edited with a commentary titled Girisambhutaratna, by Swami Vidyananda Giri, Sri Kailash Ashrama, Rishikesh, 1972
- Toṭakāṣṭakam

== Toṭakāṣṭakam ==
The Toṭakāṣṭakam was composed by Giri in praise of his Guru Ādiśaṅkara. Literally, it means a rhyme of eight (Sanskrit: aṣṭa) verses (ślokas) composed by Toṭaka. The poem's meter is anapestic tetrameter, with four feet of unstressed-unstressed-stressed syllables (laghu-laghu-guru characters) per line, and four lines per stanza.

Pada	Devanāgarī	IAST	Translation of P.R. Ramachander	Translation of Animesh Kumar ^{Stutimaṇḍala}
1	विदिताखिलशास्त्रसुधाजलधे महितोपनिषत्कथितार्थनिधे । हृदये कलये विमलं चरणं भवशङ्कर देशिक मे शरणं ॥ १॥	viditā khila śāstra sudhā jaladhe mahito paniṣat kathitār thanidhe । hṛdaye kalaye vimalaṃ caraṇaṃ bhavaśaṅkara deśika me śaraṇaṃ ॥ 1॥	I praise and seek the protection of Śaṅkara, Who is the ocean of nectar of our great holy books, And who is like the Treasure Of the essence of the great Upaniṣads And I meditate on his clear holy feet in my heart.	O Śaṅkara, Who is learned in nectar-ocean like pile of treatises, and Who is the repository of explained philosophy in the honored Upaniṣat! I throw myself before Your faultless feet in my heart. O Śaṅkara, Who is the realized master! Be my refuge.
2	करुणावरुणालय पालय माम् भवसागर दुःख विदूनहृदम् । रचयाखिलदर्शनतत्त्वविदम् भवशङ्कर देशिक मे शरणं ॥ २॥	karuṇā varuṇālaya pālaya mām bhavasāgara duḥkha vidūna hṛdam । racayā khila darśana tattva vidam bhavaśaṅkara deśika me śaraṇaṃ ॥ 2॥	I praise and seek the protection of Sankara, Who is the great ocean of mercy, And seek protection for me, who has suffered deep sorrow, In the ocean of day to day life; And also request to make me, Know all the schools of our philosophy.	O You, Whose heart is an ocean of compassion! Protect me, Whose heart is afflicted by the miseries of metempsychosis. Convert me into one, Who is learned in the object of all the philosophies. O Śaṅkara, Who is the realized master! Be my refuge.
3	भवता जनता सुहिता भविता निजबोधविचारण चारुमते । कलयेश्वर जीवविवेकविदम् भवशङ्कर देशिक मे शरणं ॥ ३॥	bhavatā janatā suhitā bhavitā nija bodha vicāraṇa cārumate । kalayeśvara jīva viveka vidam bhavaśaṅkara deśika me śaraṇaṃ ॥ 3॥	I praise and seek the protection of Śaṅkara, Who is the great ocean of mercy, And seek protection for me, who has suffered deep sorrow, In the ocean of day to day life, And also request to make me, Know all the schools of our philosophy.	By You, the common people have become satisfied. O You, Who can meditate upon the Self, and Who has a beautiful mind! Incite me to learn the knowledge of God and living-beings. O Śaṅkara, Who is the realized master! Be my refuge.
4	भव एव भवा निति मे नितरां समजायत चेतसि कौतुकिता । मम वारय मोहमहाजलधिम् भवशङ्कर देशिक मे शरणं ॥ ४॥	bhava eva bhavā niti me nitarāṃ samajāyata cetasi kautukitā । mama vāraya moha mahājaladhiṃ bhavaśaṅkara deśika me saranam ॥ 4॥	I praise and seek the protection of Śaṅkara, Because of whom the world has a pleasant life, Oh great soul who can teach the great knowledge, Make me understand the knowledge of the soul.	You are Bhava (Śiva) — thus is my conclusion. It has set-forth curiosity in my consciousness (cetas). Absolve my ocean of immense delusion.# O Śaṅkara, Who is the realized master! Be my refuge.
5	सुक्रिते’धिक्रिते बहुधा भवतो भविता समदर्शनलालसता । अतिदीनमिमं परिपालय मां भवशङ्कर देशिक मे शरणं ॥ ५॥	sukrite dhikrite bahudhā bhavato bhavitā sama darśana lālasatā । atidīna mimaṃ paripālaya māṃ bhavaśaṅkara deśika me śaraṇaṃ ॥ 5॥	I praise and seek the protection of Śaṅkara, When I understood it is him, I became ecstasic with happiness, And requested, please dry the ocean of passion in me.	When numerous virtues have been accomplished, then by You, a desire to achieve indifference emerges. Protect me, who is very weak, thoroughly. O Śaṅkara, Who is the realized master! Be my refuge.
6	जगतीमवितुं कलिताकृतयो विचरन्ति महामहसश्छलत: । अहिमांशुरिवात्र विभासि गुरो भवशङ्कर देशिक मे शरणं ॥ ६॥	jagatīm avituṃ kalitākṛtayo vicaranti mahā mahasaśchalata: । ahimāṃ śurivātra vibhāsi guro bhavaśaṅkara deśika me śaraṇaṃ ॥ 6॥	I praise and seek the protection of Śaṅkara, Those who are born to protect this world, And who are like a burning flame, Roam everywhere without any one’s knowledge; But you shine before me like the Sun God	To satiate this incomplete world, the great knowledge exponents roam in disguise [of a human]. Among them, you shine like the rays of sun. O Preceptor, O Śaṅkara, Who is the realized master! Be my refuge.
7	गुरुपुङ्गव पुङ्गव केतन ते समतामयताम् नहि को’पि सुधी: । शरणागत वत्सल तत्त्वनिधे भवशङ्कर देशिकमे शरणं ॥ ७॥	guru puṅgava puṅgava ketana te samatām ayatām nahi ko’pi sudhī: । saraṇāgata vatsala tattva nidhe bhavaśaṅkara deśikame śaraṇaṃ ॥ 7॥	I praise and seek the protection of Śaṅkara, Who is the teacher among teachers Who does not have any equal, Who is the treasure house of Philosophy And who is merciful to those who seek his blessings.	O You, Who is the best among preceptors, and Who has a bull on His flag! Indeed there is no wise expounder like you right now. O Śaṅkara, Who cares for those seeking refuge, Who is the repository of truth, and Who is the realized master! Be my refuge.
8	विदिता न मया विशदैककला न च किञ्चन काञ्चनमस्ति गुरो । द्रुतमेव विधेहि क्रुपां सहजां भवशङ्कर देशिक मे शरणं ॥ ८॥	viditā na mayā visadaika kalā na ca kiñcana kāncana masti guro । drutameva vidhehi krupāṃ sahajāṃ bhavaśaṅkara deśika me śaraṇaṃ ॥ 8॥	I praise and seek the protection of Śaṅkara, And request him to shower his natural grace fast on me, Who does not possess expertise in any branch, And who does not even a small piece of wealth(gold?)	By me, not even one quality (kalā) has been understood. I don’t even have any amount of gold (wealth), O Preceptor! Very quickly bestow compassion, which is Your second nature. O Śaṅkara, Who is the realized master! Be my refuge.

=== Footnotes ===
1. The delusion here refers to Avidyā. According to Advaitavedānta the whole world is a figment of imagination and perceived as real due to delusion. The poet is asking for removal of this delusion from his preceptor. The poet has no confusion about Śiva being Śaṅkara.

== See also ==
- Gnanananda Giri
- Adi Shankara
- Advaita Vedanta
