= Hastamalakacharya =

Disciple of Adi Shankara

- Samkhya: Kapila
- Yoga: Patanjali
- Vaisheshika: Kaṇāda, Prashastapada
- Secular: Valluvar

Hastamalakacharya (IAST Hastāmalakācārya) (c. 8th century CE) was a disciple of Adi Shankara, the Advaita philosopher. He was made the first Jagadguru (head) of the Dvāraka Pīṭhaṃ, the monastery founded by Adi Shankara in Dwaraka. Hastamalaka founded a matha by name Idayil Matham in Thrissur, Kerala.

== Meeting Adi Shankara ==
The Mādhavīya Śaṃkaravijayam states that when Adi Shankara was at Kollur, he accepted invitations by brāhmaņas to have Bhikşa (alms or food) at their houses. On such an occasion he visited a village called Śrīvalli (near Chitrapur, Uttara karnataka), where every house was said to emit the holy smell of the smoke of Agnihotra sacrifice, to accept Bhikşa. That place was inhabited by about two thousand brāhmaņas who were learned in the Vedas and performed the Yajnas prescribed in the Vedas. There was also a temple dedicated to Shiva and Parvati.

In that village there lived a brāhmaņa, Prabhākara, who was noted for his learning. He had a son who though appearing quite handsome, behaved rather like an idiot. Though upanayanam was performed for him, he did not take to studying the Vedas, instead preferred to sit around doing nothing. Hearing about Adi Shankara's visit, Prabhākara approached the Acharya (teacher) with a load of fruit and prostrated before him. He also made his son prostrate before him. Prabhākara explained to Adi Shankara that his son behaved rather like an idiot and sat idly throughout the day. Then, Adi Shankara addressed that young boy and asked him who he was. The boy replied in 12 verses containing the gist of the Advaita philosophy. Thus Adi Shankara was immensely impressed with him and accepted him as his disciple. He was named Hastāmalaka (one with the amalaka fruit in his hand) since the knowledge of the Self was natural to him like an Amalaka fruit in one's hand. Adi Shankara took the boy into his party and started towards his next destination.

== See also ==
- Adi Shankara
- Advaita Vedanta
