= Tummalapalli Ramalingeswara Rao =

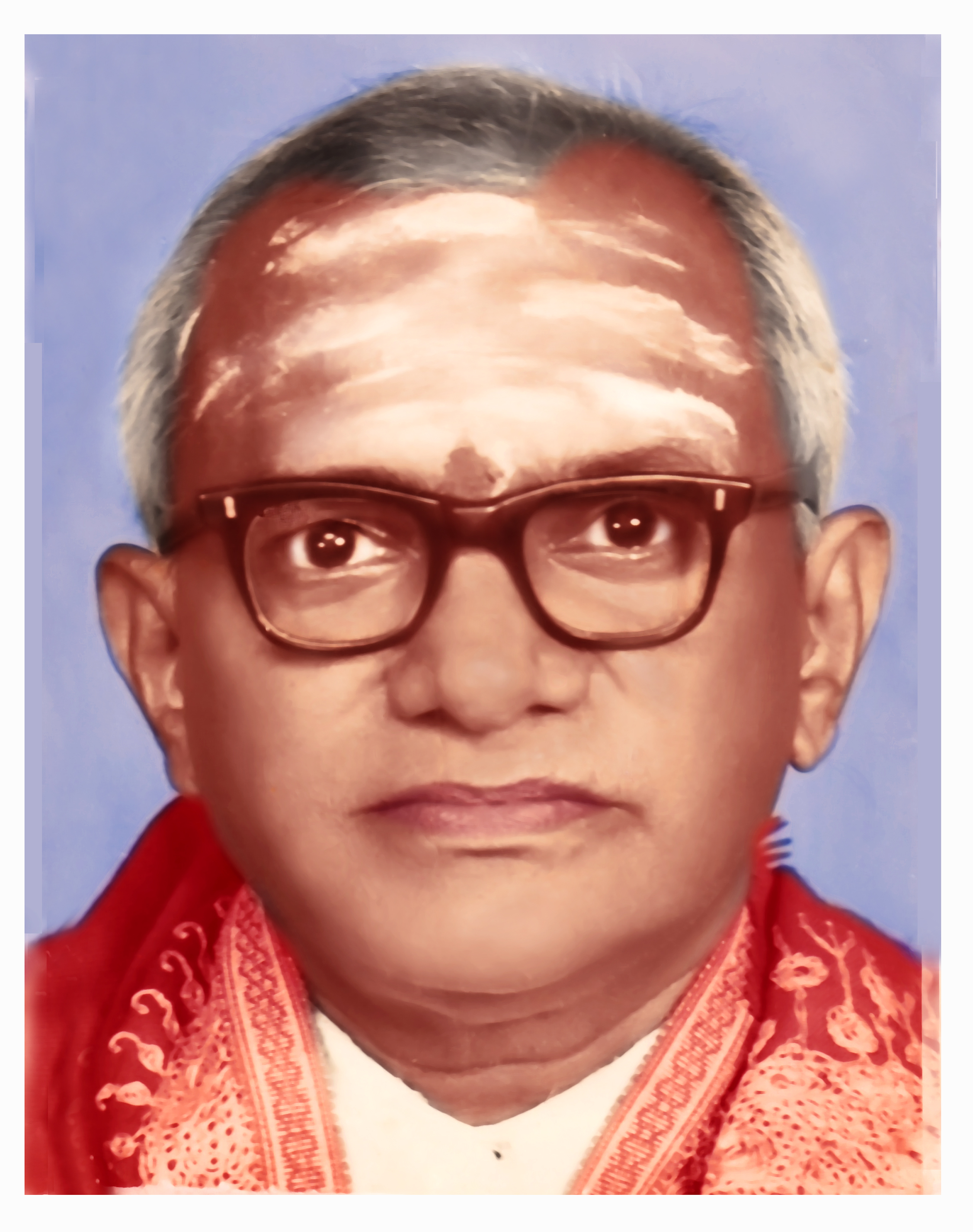
- Tummalapalli Ramalingeswara Rao

Personal life
- Born: 7 February 1921 Gudivada, Krishna District, Andhra Pradesh
- Died: 16 October 1991 (aged 70) Hyderabad, Telangana State
- Spouse: Visalakshi
- Children: 4
- Parent(s): Tummalapalli Jwalapati, Mahalakshmamma
- Notable work(s): Sri Lalitha Sahasranama Stotra Bhashyamu, Srichakra Vilasanamu, Srichakra Pooja Vidhaanam, Dharmanirnayam, Tikkana Somayaji.
- Pen name: Sadasivananda natha
- Occupation: Litterateur
- Honours: Aarsha Vidya Vaachaspati, Srividya Ratnakara, Sarvatantra Swatantra
- Website: https://tummalapalliramalingeswararao.com

Religious life
- Religion: Hinduism
- Philosophy: Advaita Vedanta

Religious career
- Teacher: Jagadguru Sri Chandrasekhara Bharati Mahaswami, the 34th Pontiff of Sringeri Sharada Peetham

Tummalapalli Ramalingeswara Rao (7 February 1921 – 16 October 1991) was a Telugu poet, novelist, literary critic, philosophical journalist, writer of English prose and an exponent of Mantra Shastra and tradition. His works covered a wide range of subjects like history, sociology, literature, philosophy, religion and spiritualism. His popular works include Sri Lalitha Sahasranama Stotra Bhashyamu, Sri Chakra Vilasanamu, Sri Chakra Pooja Vidhanam (Mantra Sastra, philosophy and spiritualism), Dharmanirnayam (social novel), Tikkana Somayaji (Historical novel), Sivanugrahamu Pitruyagnamu (Poetry) and Sringeri Revisited (Musings in Philosophy and mysticism).

== Personal life ==
Tummalapalli Ramalingeswara Rao was born on 7 February 1921 to the Telugu family of Tummalapalli Jwalapati and Mahalakshmamma in Gudivada, Krishna District of Andhra Pradesh. After completing his school education in Gudivada, he went on to study at the Government Arts College, Rajahmundry, Andhra Pradesh and received his bachelor's degree in science. Ramalingeswara Rao married Visalakshi from Telaprolu in Krishna District of Andhra Pradesh and with her had three daughters (Uma Devi, Janaki, Lakshmi Savitri) and a son (Dr. Jwalaprakasa Vidyapati). He worked in Revenue Department of West Godavari District, Andhra Pradesh. He resigned the government job to join a mining company in Cuddapah, Andhra Pradesh and worked as a business executive. He shifted to Madras in 1961 and retreated into solitude of meditation and probe into the rationality of Indian spiritual and religious thought. He shed his mortal coil on the day of Durgashtami (16 October 1991) during Navaratri.

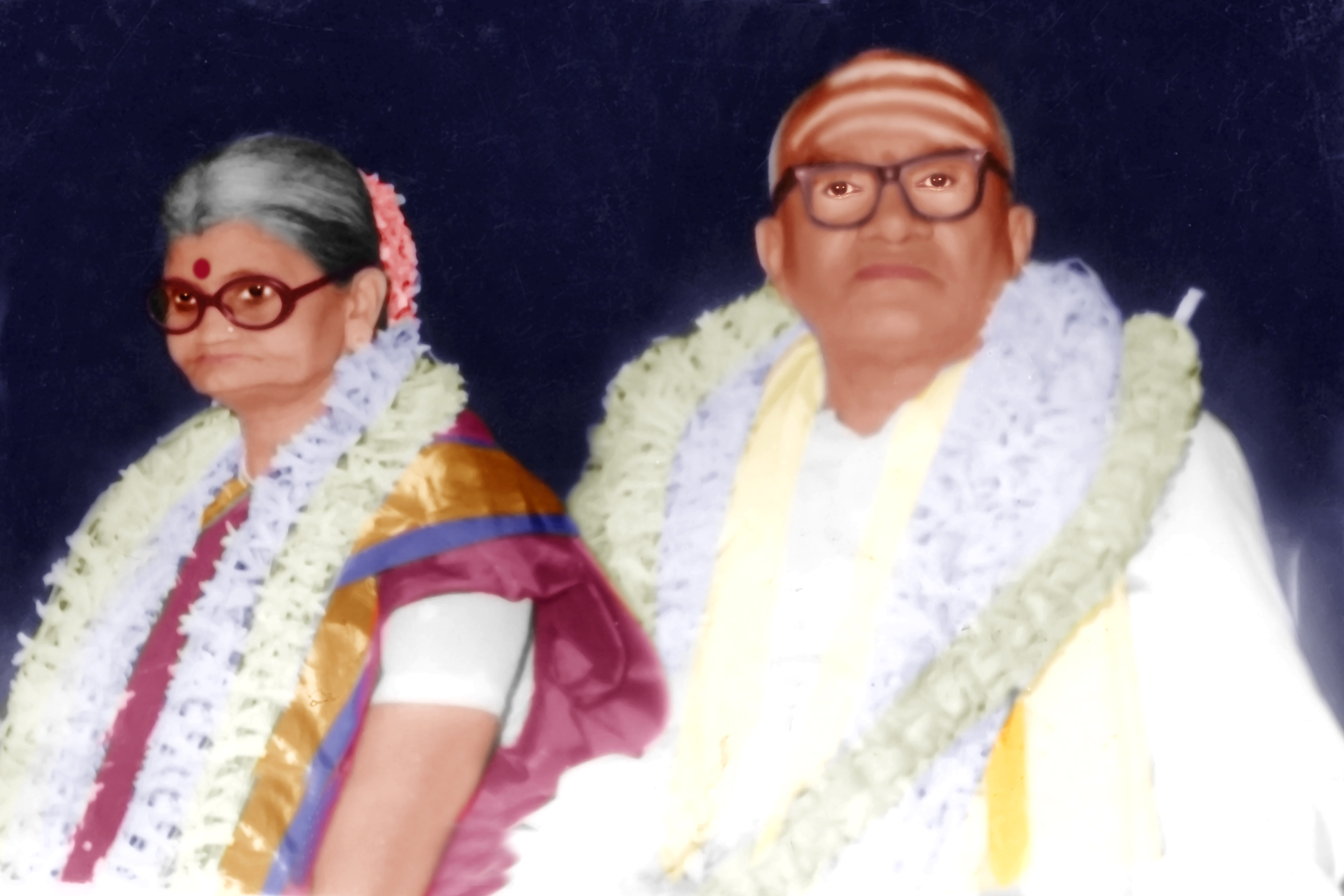
Tummalapalli Ramalingeswara Rao with his wife Visalakshi

== Spirituality ==
Ramalingeswara Rao secured the grace of Sri Chandrasekhara Bharati Mahaswami, the 34th Pontiff of Sringeri Sharada Peetham and he was initiated into Sri Vidya by the Mahaswami. Guru’s grace made Rao's tongue the seat of the myriad faced literary muse. He authored several books on Mantra Sastra. With the divine blessings of Sri Abhinava Vidyatirtha Mahaswami (35th Pontiff of Sringeri Sarada Peetham) and Sri Bharati Tirtha Mahaswami (36th Pontiff of Sringeri Sharada Peetham), he served as Editor of Sri Sankara Krupa (a philosophical and spiritual Telugu monthly magazine of Sringeri Sharada Peetham) for more than two decades. After the demise of his wife, he embraced Sanyasa in 1988 at Sringeri. He was given the yogapatta (monastic name) Sri Adwayananda Bharati.

== Literary career ==
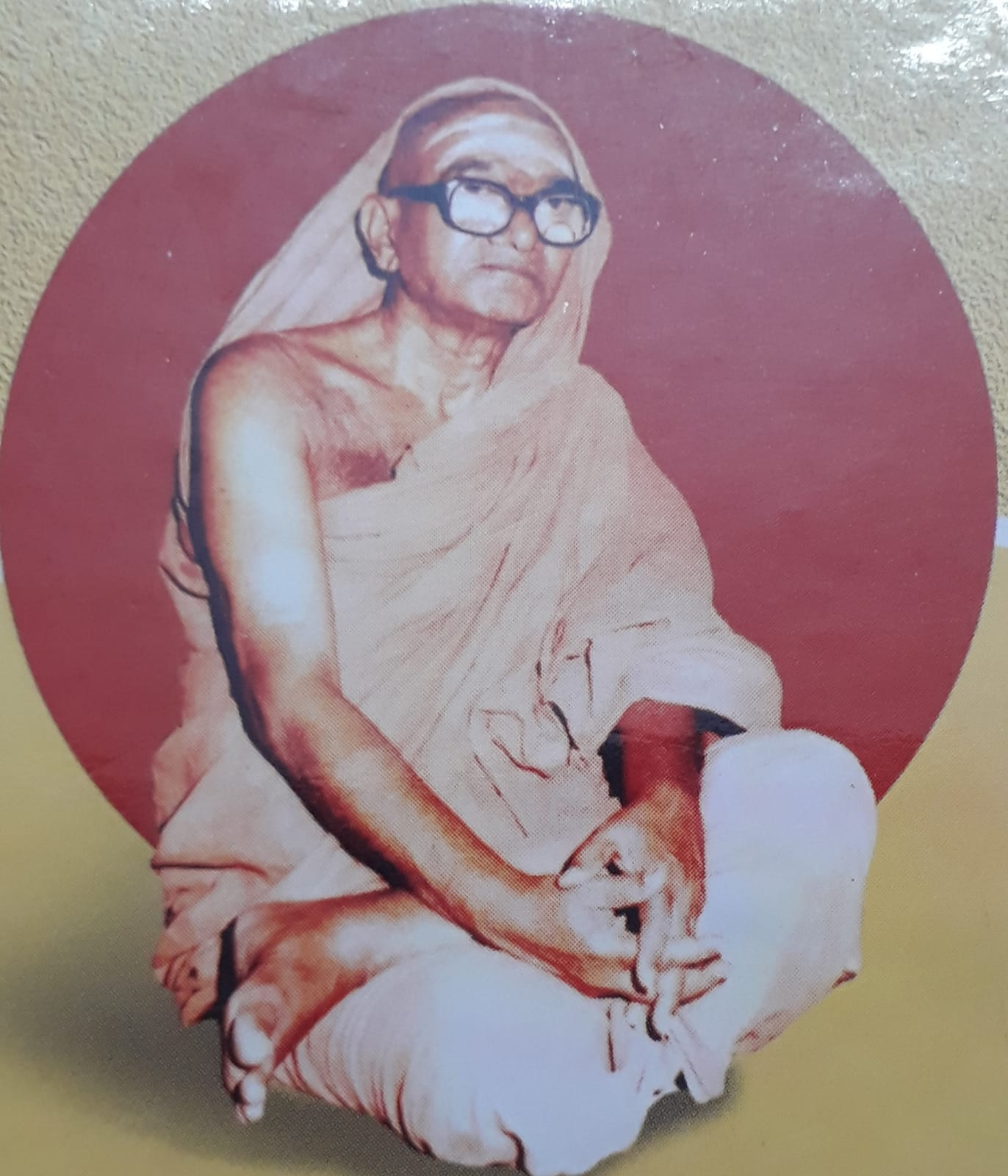
Sri Adwayananda Bharati Swami

Tummalapalli Ramalingeswara Rao’s works include Social and historical novels, poems, books on Mantra Sastra and Darsana Sastra, books on literary criticism, essays, translations from English to Telugu, introductions and forewords, editing, short stories for children and radio talks. His books on Mantra Sastra got appreciation from Saints of Sringeri Sharada Peetham, Siddheswari Peetham,Courtallam and other scholars. His novels and literary criticism made landmarks in the history of Telugu literature. His social novel Dharmanirnayam was considered as one of the best ten novels in Telugu. Two of his works - Dharmanirnayam and Sringeri Revisited - were translated into Kannada language. His novels were the subject of study for doctoral level research in the field of Telugu literature.

== Bibliography ==
Following works of Tummalapalli Ramalingeswara Rao (Sri Adwayananda Bharati Swami in his Turiyashrama) have been published.

=== Poetry ===
- Sivanugrahamu – Pitruyagnamu
- Hasyagaadha Dwisathi
- Preyonuvakamu
- Godavari Garbhamu
- Agnishtomamu

=== Social and historical novels ===
- Dharmanirnayam
- Tikkana Somayaji
- Pothanamatyulu
- Tallapaka Annamacharyulu
- Manaku Migilindi
- Meenakshi Pellichesukundi
- Subbaiah Kodukulu
- Idi Eppudoo Inte
- Kollam Andu

=== Mantra Sastra ===
- Sri Chakra Vilasanamu
- Sri Chakra Pooja Vidhanamu
- Saundaryalahari
- Sri Lalitha Sahasranama Stotra Bhashyamu
- Sri Lalitha Trisathinama Bhashyanuvadamu
- Sri Sankara Bhagavatpada Granthamala

=== Literary criticism ===
- Sri Tummalapalli Ramalingeswara Rao Sahitya Vimarsalu

=== Vedic commentary ===
- Mantra Pushpamu
- Panchasukta Manyusooktamulu
- Aditya Hrudayamu
- Kesavadi Chaturvimsatinama Vyakhyanamu
- Sri Vishnu Sahasranama Stotramu
- Mohamudgaraha
- Sri Lalitha Sahasranama Stotramu
- Sri Kanakadhara Stotramu

=== Philosophy and religion ===
- Manamu Mana Mathamu

=== English books ===
- Sringeri Revisited
- Sri Sureswaracharya
- A Profile of Kalady
- Rationale of Mantra Sastra
- Our Sannidhanam
- Sri Sankara Bhagavatpada (His date and a Traditional profile of his life)

=== Translations ===
- Brahmavidya Vyakhyana Simhasanamu
- Kalady
- Malli Chuchina Sringeri
- Kanchi Sri Kamakshi Devi
- Sri Sankaracharya Vijayamu

== Awards and honors ==
- He was given the honorifics Aarsha Vidya Vachaspati, Sri Vidya Ratnakara and Sarvatantra Swatantra.
- In 1974 he was honored by a felicitations Committee in Madras.
- In 1979 he was felicitated by Kalabharati, Madras.
- In 1980 he was honored with Sri Yarlagadda Rajyalakshmi Venkanna Chowdary Kalapeetham Award.
- In 1981 he was honored on the occasion of his Shashthipurti in Madras.
- In 1989 Sri Adwayananda Bharati Swami (Tummalapalli Ramalingeswara Rao in his poorvashrama) was honored in Hyderabad on his completion of first Chaturmasya Vratha Deeksha.

== Sri Adwayananda Bharati Swami Trust ==
With a view to preserve and maintain the traditional, cultural and spiritual values and heritage of India, Sri Adwayananda Bharati Swami Trust was established in 1989 in honor of Sri Adwayananda Bharati Swami.
