= Devavrat Mahesh Rekhe =

Vedic scholar from India

Vedamurti Devavrat Mahesh Rekhe
- देवव्रत महेश रेखे
- Born: Ahilya Nagar, Maharashtra
- Citizenship: Indian
- Education: Vallabharam Shaligram Sangved Vidyalaya, Varanasi
- Occupation: Vedic scholar
- Known for: Completing the Dandakrama Parayanam of 50 days
- Father: Vedabrahmashri Mahesh Chandrakant Rekhe

Devavrat Mahesh Rekhe (Sanskrit: देवव्रत महेश रेखे) is an emerging Vedic scholar in India. He is awarded with the title Vedamurti. He has become popular by completing an important ritual known as Dandakrama Parayanam in the Vedic tradition. He completed the Dandakrama Parayanam in 50 days without any interruption. In the sacred ritual, he chanted 2000 mantras of the Madhyandini Shakha of the text Shukla Yajurveda flawlessly. After the completion of the Dandakrama Parayanam, he emerged as a notable scholar in traditional Guru Shishya Parampara in India.

== Early life ==
Devavrat Mahesh Rekhe was born in the Ahilya Nagar district of Maharashtra in India. He belongs to a Brahmin family in Maharashtra. He is the son of Vedabrahmashri Mahesh Chandrakant Rekhe. In the age of 19, he became a scholar of Vedic literature.

== Achievements ==
According to the Sringeri Math, he completed the Dandakrama Parayanam in the original classical form recitation of the mantras in the Madhyandini Shakha of the Shukla Yajurveda in the time span of 50 days. He recited nearly 2000 mantras of the ancient Vedic text in the 50 days. This discipline of chanting the Vedic mantras is regarded as the “crown jewel” in the tradition. It is said that the labyrinthine phonetic architecture of the Vedic chanting in its original form is recorded only three times in the known history of the tradition in the last 200 years.

== Recognitions and rewards ==
After the completion of the Dandakrama Parayanam recitation of the Shukla Yajurveda, he received recognition from the spiritual community of the Vedic tradition. He was also praised by the Prime Minister Narendra Modi of India for his historic record of the achievement. Apart from the emotional and appraisal recognitions, he was also honoured with a golden bracelet worth ₹5 lakh and a cash reward of ₹1,11,116 by the Jagadguru Shankaracharyas of the Dakshinamnaya Sri Sringeri Sharada Peetham as blessings.
