= Holy water =

Water blessed by a religious figure

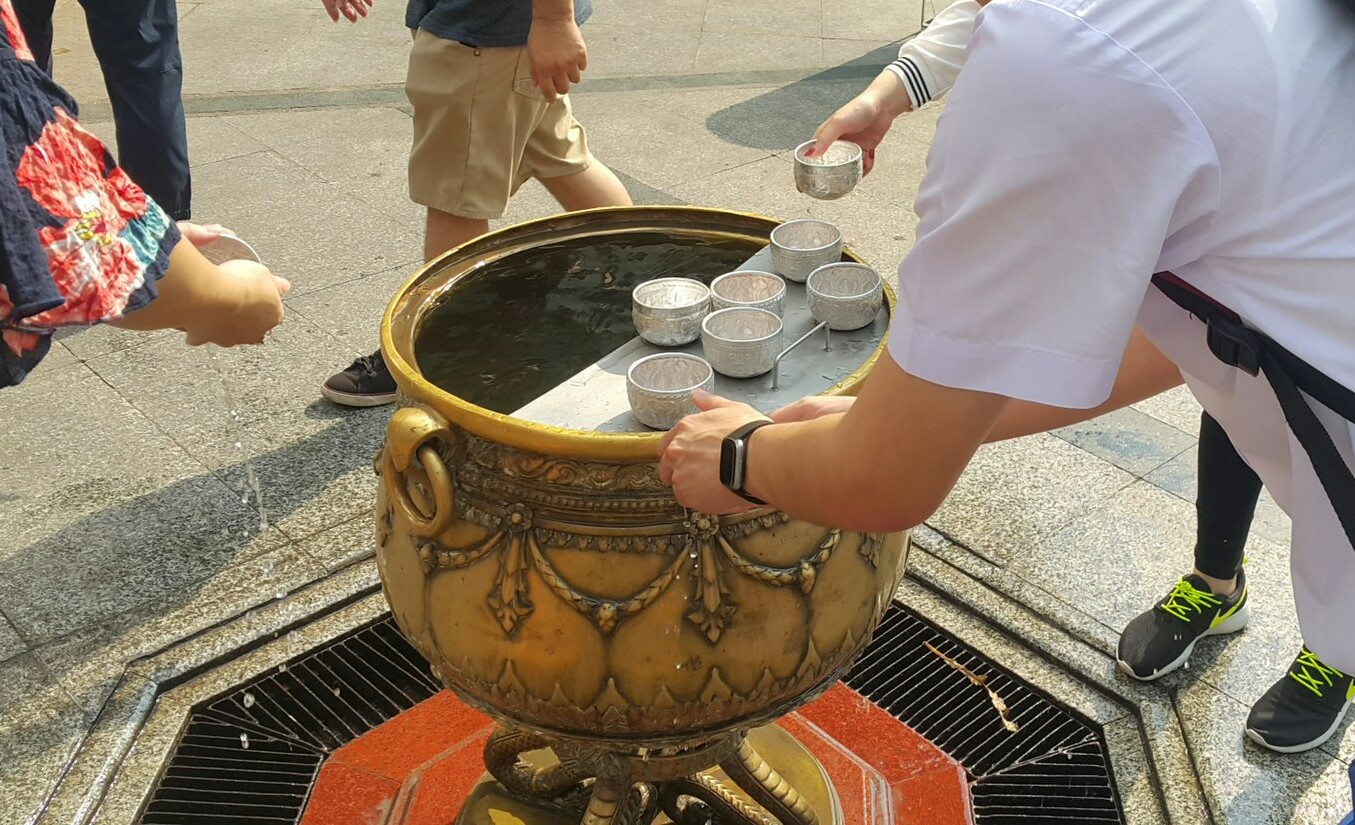
A Thai student pouring the holy water on his two hands at Erawan shrine, Bangkok

Holy water is water that has been blessed by a member of the clergy or a religious figure, or derived from a well or spring considered holy. The use for cleansing prior to a baptism and spiritual cleansing is common in several religions, from Christianity to Sikhism. The use of holy water as a sacramental for protection against evil is common among Catholics, Eastern Christians, and some Protestants.

== By religion ==
=== Sikhism ===
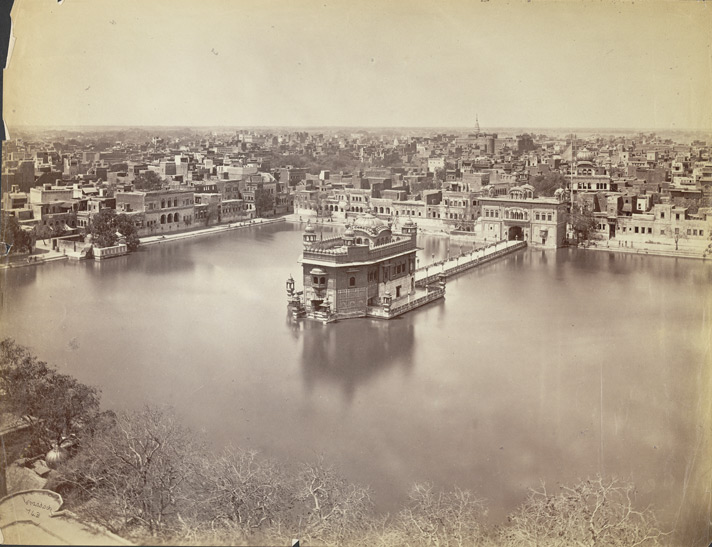
An 1880 photograph of the Golden Temple, sacred pool and the nearby buildings

One of the holiest sites in Sikhism, Harmandir Sahib, is surrounded by a pool of water called amritsar or amritsarovar (sarovar means sacred water and amrit means "sacred" and to add onto sarovar, it would mean sacred water). For those who wish to take a dip in the pool, the Temple provides a half hexagonal shelter and holy steps to Har ki Pauri (god's steps). Bathing in the pool is believed by many Sikhs to have restorative powers, purifying one's karma. Some carry bottles of the pool water home particularly for sick friends and relatives. The pool is maintained by volunteers who perform kar da seva (house's duty or ਕਾਰ ਦਾ ਸਿਵਾ) by draining and desilting it periodically.

Sikhs use the Punjabi term amrita (ਅੰਮ੍ਰਿਤ) for the holy water used in the baptism ceremony known as Amrit Sanskar or Amrit Chhakhna.

=== Hinduism ===
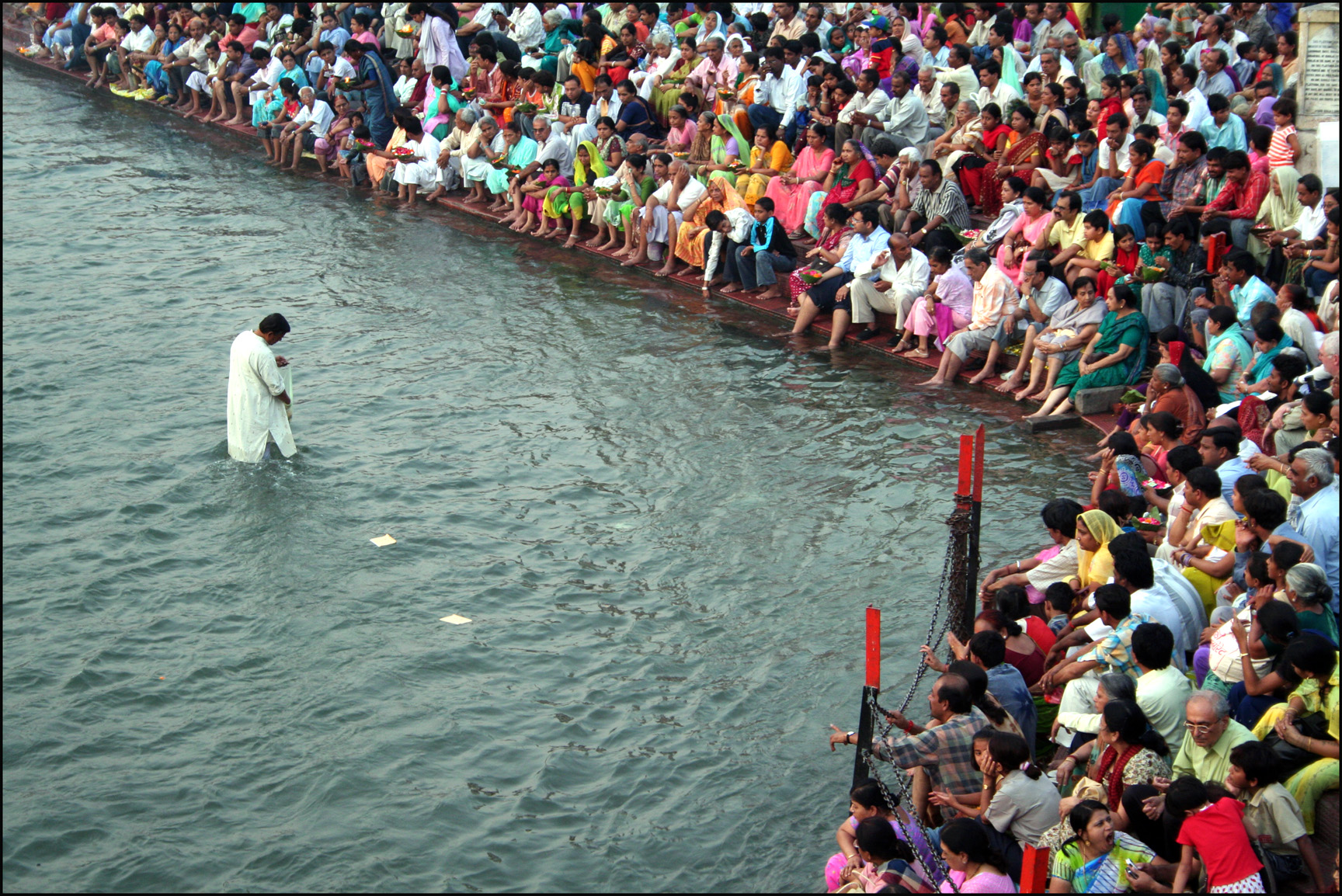
A Hindu public prayer in the river Ganges

The significance of water in Hinduism is described in the hymn called the mantra pushpam, present in the Taitiriya Aranyakam section of the text Yajurveda. Bathing in holy water is a key element in Hinduism, and the Ganges is considered the holiest Hindu river. Holy water in Hinduism is thought to purify the soul and combat evil. Some Hindus use holy water to wash hands before ringing a bell.

=== Buddhism ===
The idea of "blessed water" is used in virtually all Buddhist traditions. In the Theravada tradition, water is put into a new pot and kept near a Paritrana ceremony, a blessing for protection. This "lustral water" can be created in a ceremony in which the burning and extinction of a candle above the water represents the elements of earth, fire, and air. This water is later given to the people to be kept in their home. Not only water but also oil and strings are blessed in this ceremony. Most Mahayana Buddhists typically recite sutras or various mantras (typically that of the bodhisattva Avalokitesvara for example) numerous times over the water, which is then either consumed or is used to bless homes afterwards. In Vajrayana Buddhism, a Bumpa, a ritual object, is one of the Ashtamangala, used for storing sacred water sometimes, symbolizing wisdom and long life.

=== Islam ===
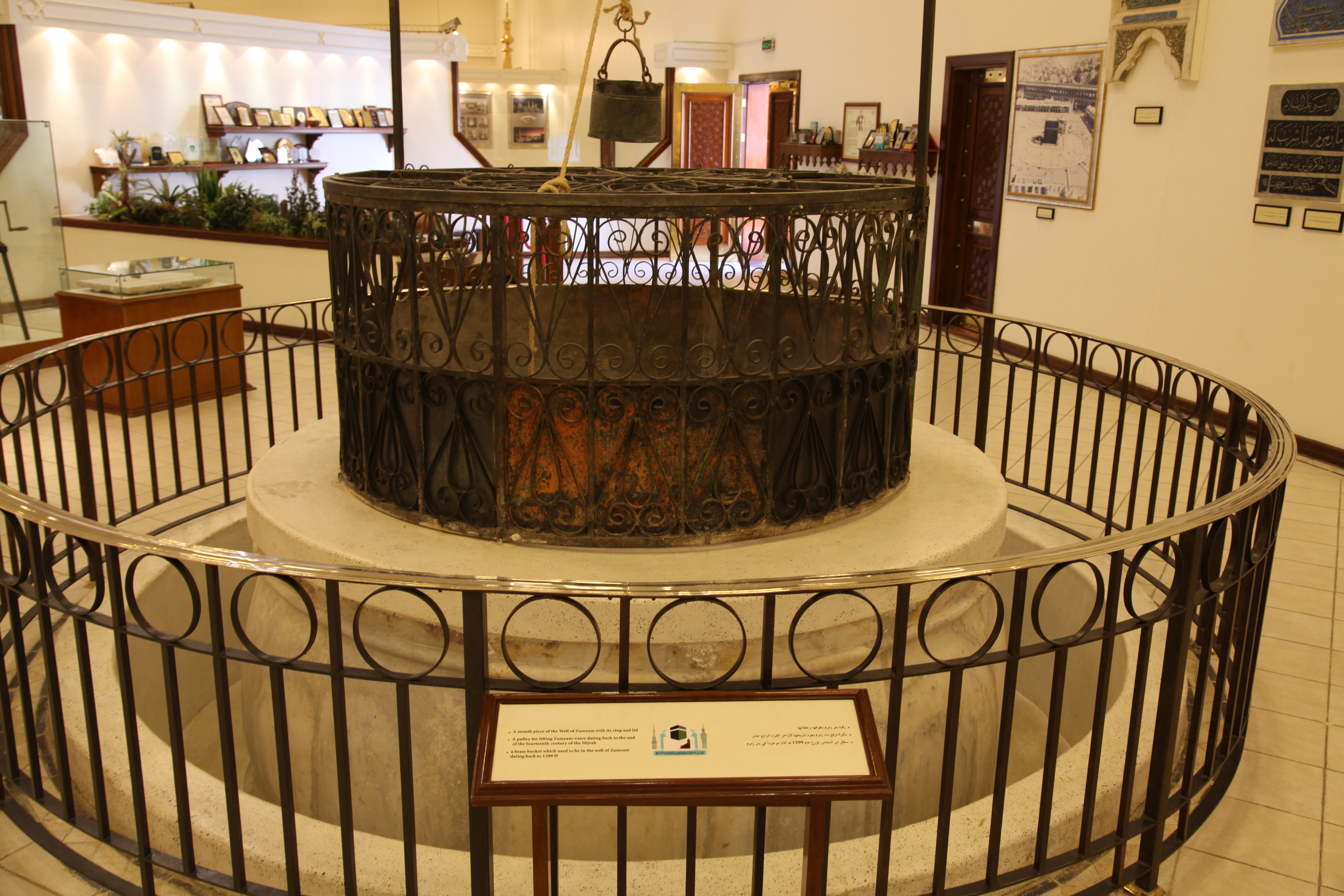
Mouth-piece of the Zam Zam well in Masjid al-Haram

The Muslim variety of holy water is the Zamzam water that comes from a spring near the Kaaba in Mecca.

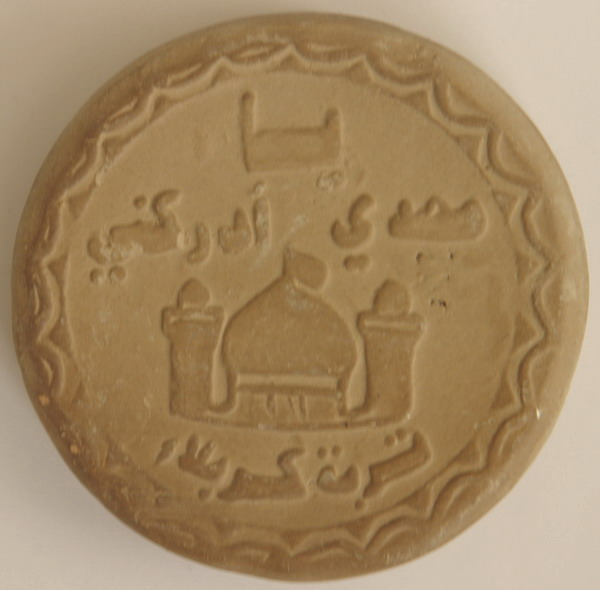
Khak-e Shifa, made from the soil of Husayn ibn Ali's grave

The drinking of "healing water" (āb-i shifā) is a practice in various denominations of Shia Islam. In the tradition of the Twelver Shi'a, many dissolve the dust of sacred locations such as Karbala (khāk-i shifa) and Najaf and drink the water (āb-i shifā) as a cure for illness, both spiritual and physical.

The Ismaili tradition involves the practice of drinking water blessed by the Imam of the time. This water is taken in the name of the Imam and has a deep spiritual significance. This is evident from the names used to designate the water, including light (nūr) and ambrosia (amṛt, amī, amīras, amījal). This practice is recorded from the 13th and 14th centuries and continues to the present day. The ceremony is known as ghat-pat in South Asia.

=== Judaism ===
Water rituals are common in Judaism, including Mikvah, Netilat Yadayim, and Mayim Acharonim. There is not a particular concept of holy water being different than any other water, and water used in rituals can be discarded in any manner. In fact, natural flowing waters such as rivers and the ocean can be used for both ritual bathing, and taking possession of new kitchen tools.

=== Mandaeism ===
In Mandaeism, mambuha (Classical Mandaic: ࡌࡀࡌࡁࡅࡄࡀ), sometimes spelled mambuga, is sacramental drinking water used in rituals such as the masbuta (baptism), while halalta (Classical Mandaic: ࡄࡀࡋࡀࡋࡕࡀ) is sacramental rinsing water used in rituals such as the masiqta (death mass).

=== Others ===
In Ancient Greek religion, holy water called khernips (Greek: χέρνιψ) was created when a torch from a religious shrine was extinguished in it. In Greek religion, purifying people and locations with water was part of the process of distinguishing the sacred from the profane.

In Wicca and other ceremonial magic traditions, a bowl of salt is blessed and a small amount is stirred into a bowl of water that has been ritually purified. In some traditions of Wicca, this mixture of water and salt symbolizes the brine of the sea, which is regarded as the womb of the Goddess, and the source of all life on Earth. The mixture is consecrated and used in many religious ceremonies and magical rituals.

In the Kingdom of Barue (modern-day Mozambique) during the late-18th and 19th centuries, the last event of a Makombe's (king's) installation involved the Makombe fasting for three days, reportedly to learn about hardship. After this, a Portuguese representative brought a flask of holy water (mazia manga, lit. 'water that binds'), and poured it over the head of the Makombe, believed to imbue him with sacred qualities. The Makombe was then to choose between a bow and arrow, and a hoe, wherein choosing the hoe meant peaceful relations. André Van Dokkum wrote that this may have been introduced after a war during the 1760s between the Barue and the Portuguese, and was intended to foster good relations between the two. Allen Isaacman considered it unclear whether this was an indigenous tradition or a syncretisation with Christianity, however he pointed to the Barue's historical resistance to Portuguese influence and interference as evidence of the former.

== Unofficial uses ==
Holy water has also been believed to ward off or act as a weapon against mythical evil creatures, such as vampires and werewolves. In eastern Europe, one might sprinkle holy water onto the corpse of a suspected vampire in order to destroy it or render it inert. Thereafter, the concept proliferated into fiction about such creatures.

== See also ==
- Dedication
- Exorcism in the Catholic Church
- Halalta in Mandaeism
- Holy anointing oil
- Mambuha in Mandaeism
- Sacred waters
- Schiller Woods magic water pump
