= Mambuha =

Drinking water used in Mandaean rituals

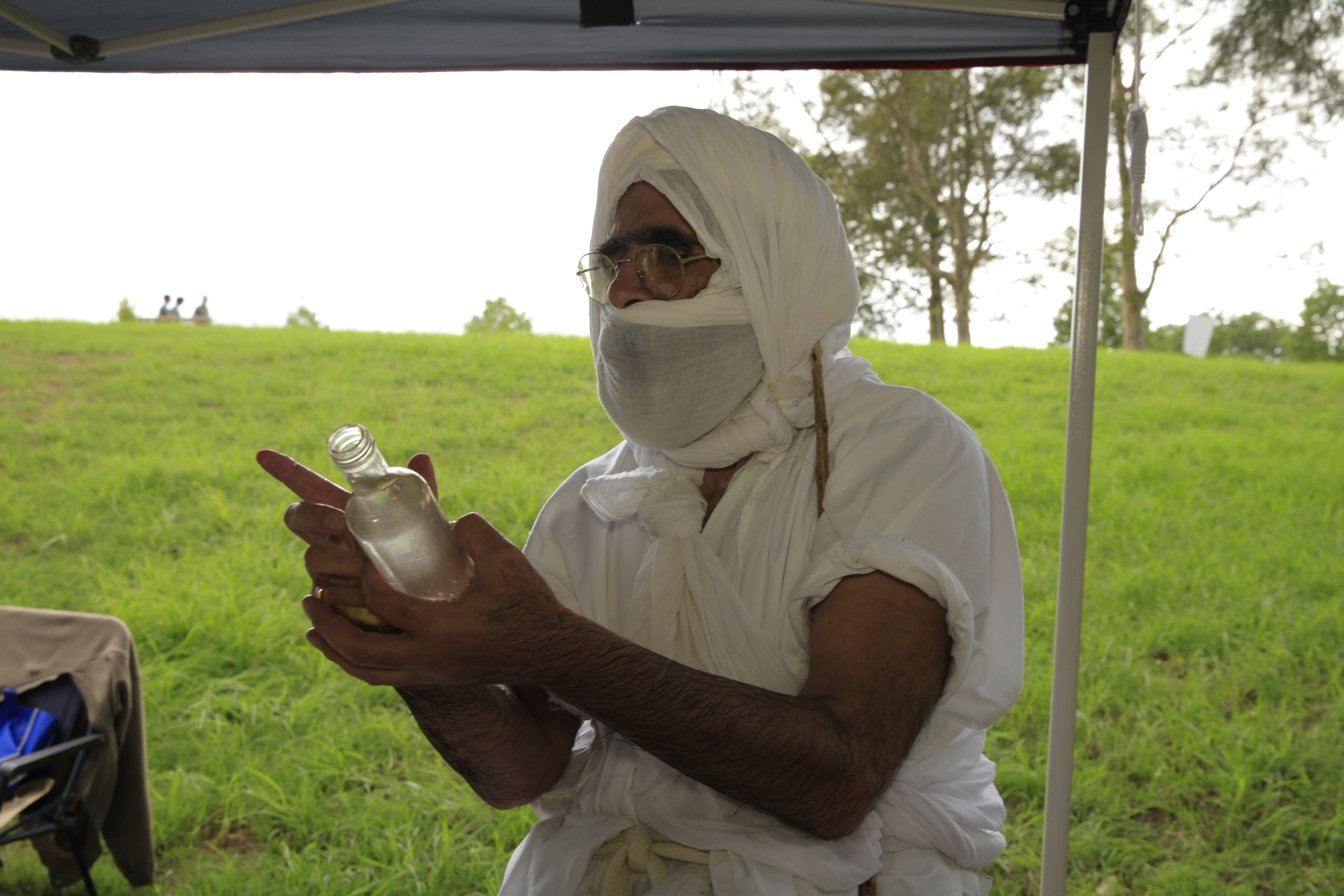
Sheikh Salah Choheili blessing the mambuha contained in a qanina (glass bottle) during the 2014 Parwanaya in Sydney, Australia

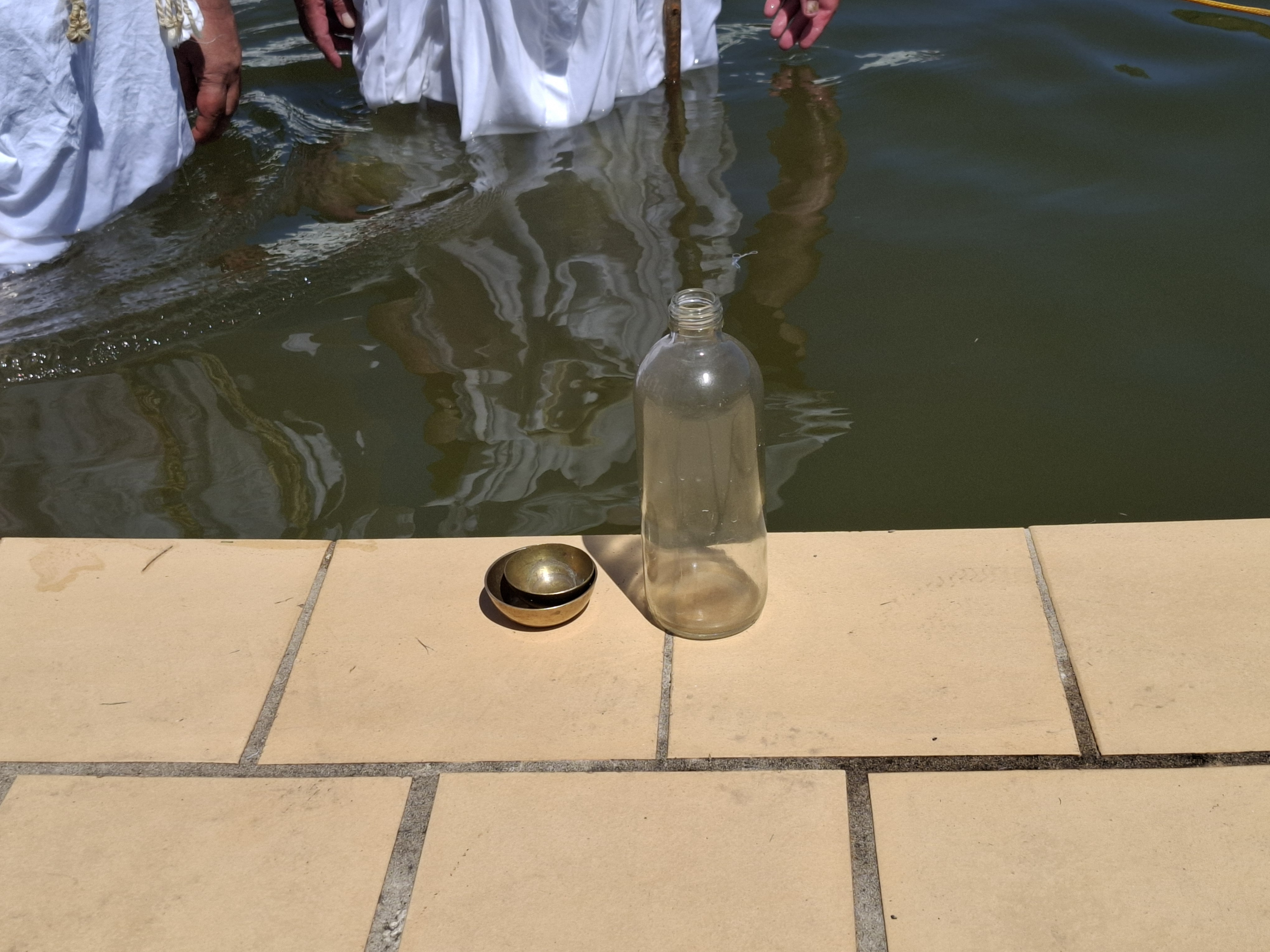
Qanina (ritual glass bottle) used for holding mambuha at Wallacia Mandi during Parwanaya 2025

In Mandaeism, mambuha (Classical Mandaic: ࡌࡀࡌࡁࡅࡄࡀ, Modern Mandaic pronunciation: [mamˈbuha]), sometimes spelled mambuga (Classical Mandaic: ࡌࡀࡌࡁࡅࡂࡀ), is sacramental drinking water used in rituals such as the masbuta (baptism).

The mambuha can be served in a kapta (pronounced kafta), a shallow brass drinking bowl that is 11 inches or less in perimeter, or in a qanina (glass bottle).

Traditionally, mambuha is taken directly from the yardna (river, i.e. the Euphrates, Tigris, or Karun rivers), but the Mandaean diaspora often uses treated tap water.

== Prayers ==
Various prayers in the Qulasta, including prayers 33, 44, 45, 60, and 82, are recited during the drinking of the mambuha.

== See also ==
- Halalta (rinsing water)
- Holy water
- Holy water in Eastern Christianity
