= Sachchidananda Shivabhinava Narasimha Bharati =

33rd jagadguru Shankaracharya of dakshinamnaya srinegri sharda peetam

His Holiness Jagadguru Shankaracharya Sachchidananda Shivabhinava Narasimha Bharathi
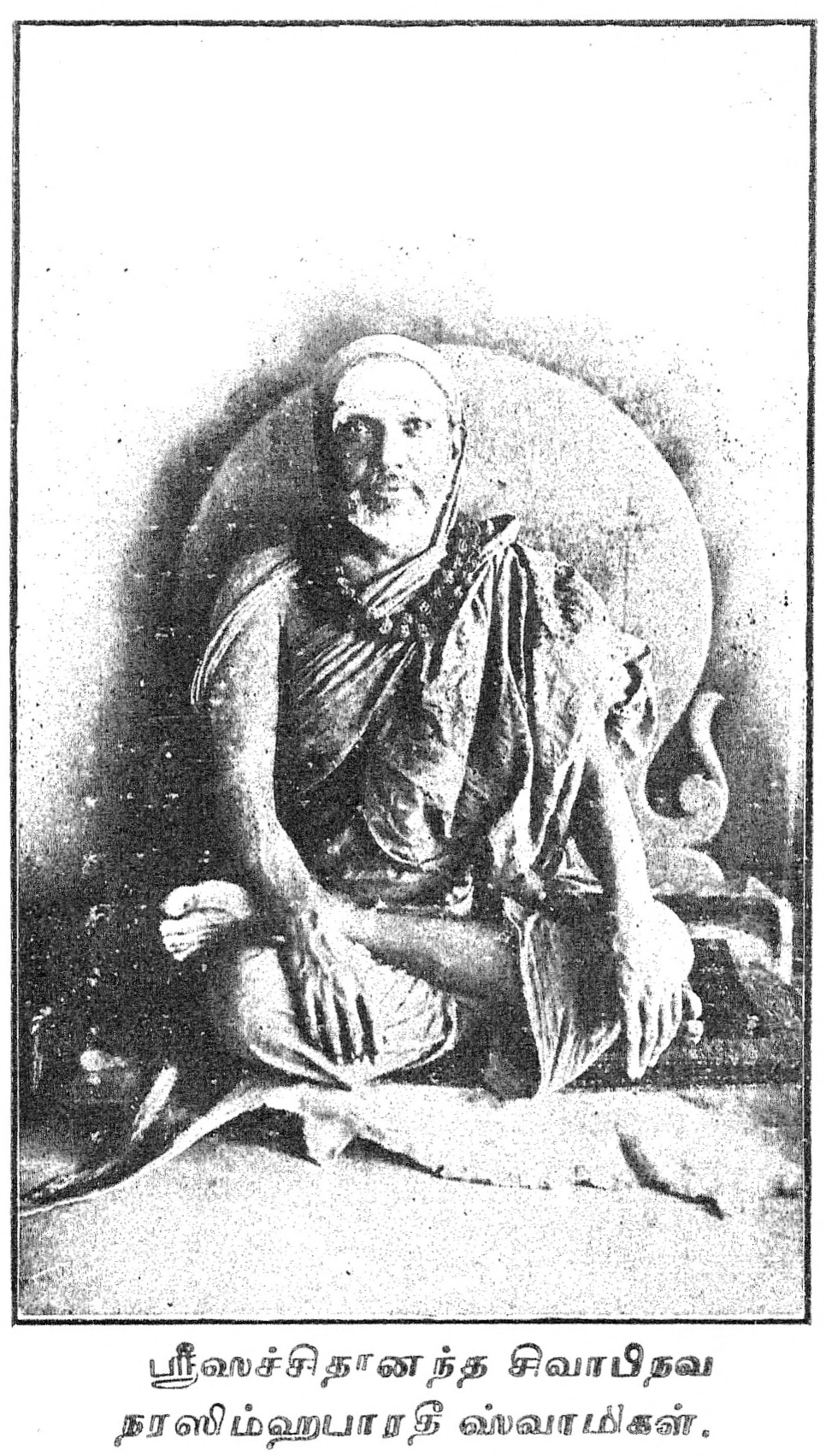
- Born: Shivaswami; 1858; Sringeri, India
- Died: 1912 (aged 53–54)
- Title: 33rd Jagadguru Shankaracharya of Sringeri Sharada Peetham
- Predecessor: Narasimha Bharati VIII
- Successor: Chandrashekhara Bharati III

Sri Sachchidananda Shivabhinava Narasimha Bharathi Mahaswamigalu (born as Shivaswami; 11 March 1858 – 1912) was the head of the Sringeri Sharada Peetham from 1879 to 1912. He played a pivotal role in identifying Kalady as the birthplace of the great Hindu Saint Adi Shankara., He is said to have played a significant role in the construction of the Sringeri Complex in Chikkamagaluru.

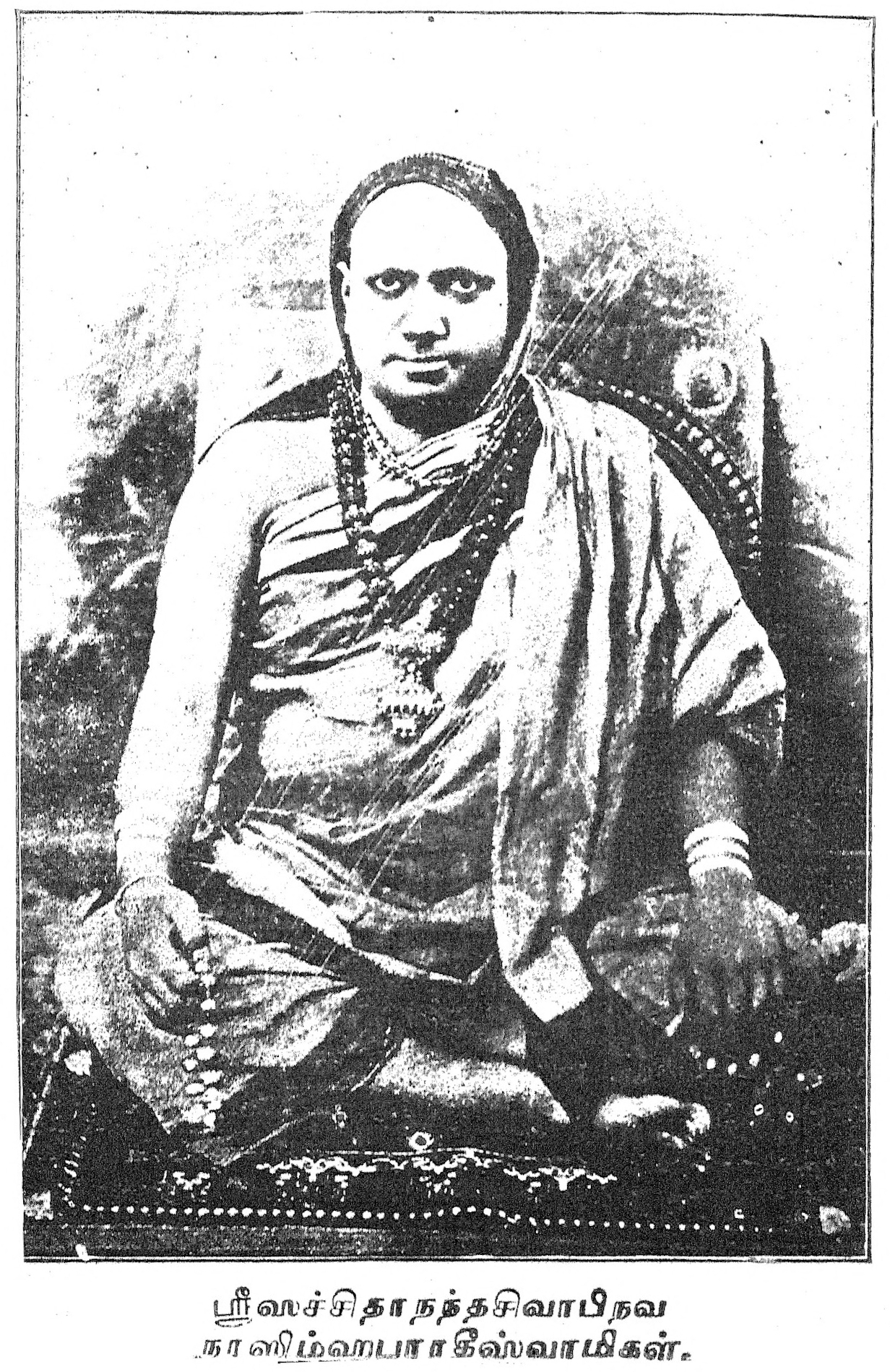
Young Sachchidananda Shivabhinava Narasimha Bharati

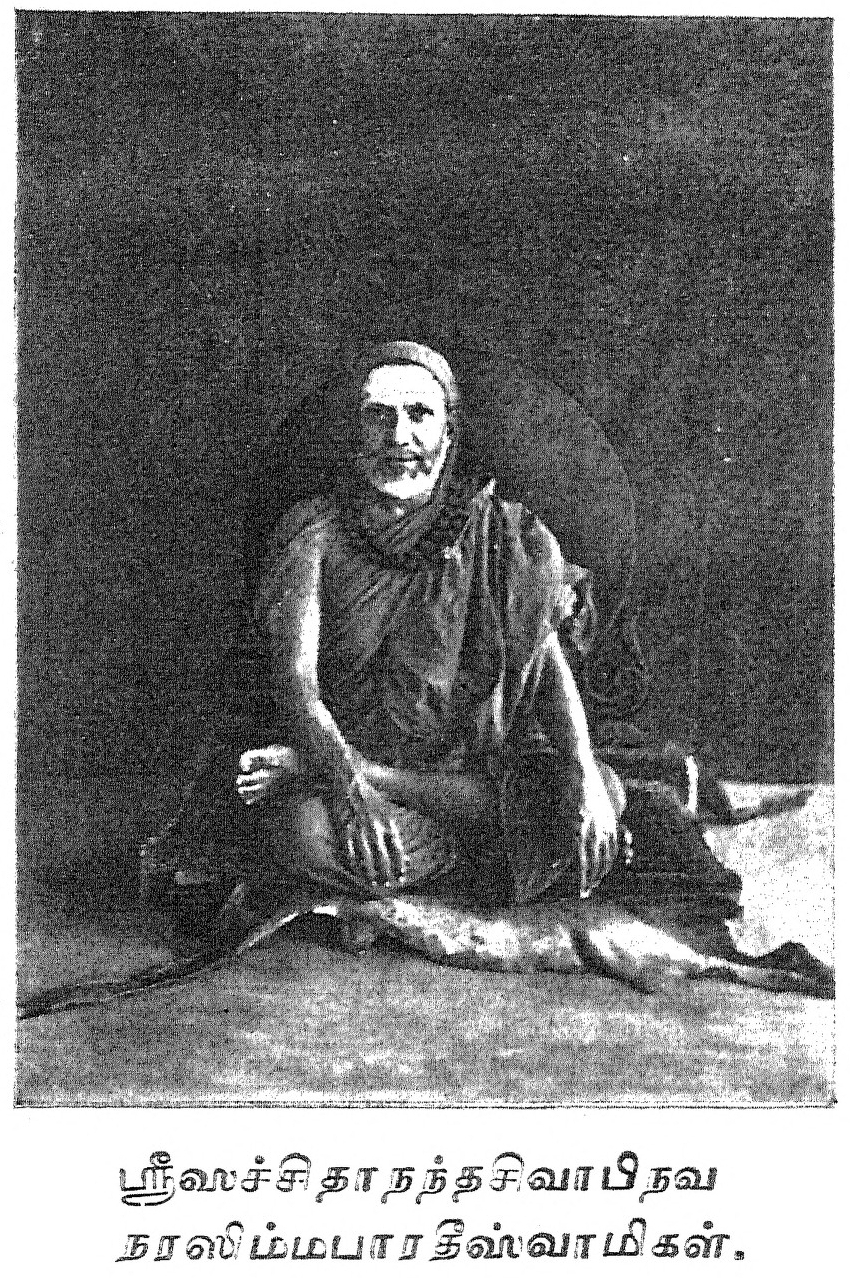

Preceded by Narasimha Bharati VIII	Jagadguru of Sringeri Sharada Peetham; 1879–1912	Succeeded by Chandrashekhara Bharati III
