= Swaroopanandendra Saraswati =

- Title: Vishaka Sri Sarada Pīṭādipati

Personal life
- Born: 1964 (age 61–62) Ranastalam, Srikakulam

Religious life
- Religion: Hinduism

Vishaka Sri Sarada Pīṭādipati
- Incumbent
- Assumed office 4 Aug 1997

Swaroopanandendra Saraswati (born 1964) is the 1st Pīṭādipati of Vishaka Sri Sarada Peetham, Visakhapatnam. He established the Vishaka Sri Sarada Peetham in the year of 1997.

== Biography ==
Sri Swaroopanandendra Saraswati was born in 1964 in Ranastalam, Srikakulam District. Swaroopanandendra Saraswati played important and vital role in Telugu states political hinduthva politics.
