= Halalta =

Rinsing water used in Mandaean rituals

In Mandaeism, halalta (Classical Mandaic: ࡄࡀࡋࡀࡋࡕࡀ) is sacramental rinsing water used in rituals such as the masiqta (death mass). It is different from mambuha, which is water used only for drinking but not rinsing.

During the Ṭabahata Masiqta, halalta is kept in bottles. Priests use the water to rinse their bowls and then drink all of it, since none of it can be spilled or wasted.

== See also ==
- Mambuha
- Holy water
