= Dandakrama Parayanam =

Disciplined recitation of Vedic mantras

Dandakrama Parayanam (Sanskrit: दण्डक्रमपरायणम्) refers to an ancient and disciplined Yajna rooted in the Hindu Vedic tradition. This grueling process calls for the ceaseless recitation of approximately 2,000 mantras from the Shukla Yajurveda in the Dandaka chanda, spanning a staggering 50 consecutive days. In December 2025, Vedamurti Devabrahma Mahesh Rekhe, a 19-year-old Vedic scholar, successfully completed this Yajna in Kashi, India. It is the first successful Dandakrama Parayanam in nearly two centuries.

Renowned for its metrical precision, the ritual derives its name from "Danda," alluding to the staff-like structure of the mantras, and "Krama," meaning their flawless sequence. Participants are required to recite the mantras without pause, break, or slip-up. Historically, the Dandakrama Parayanam has evolved by drawing upon the Shruti tradition (oral lineage) of the Vedas.
