= Vishaka Sri Sarada Peetham =

- విశాఖ శ్రీ శారద పీఠం
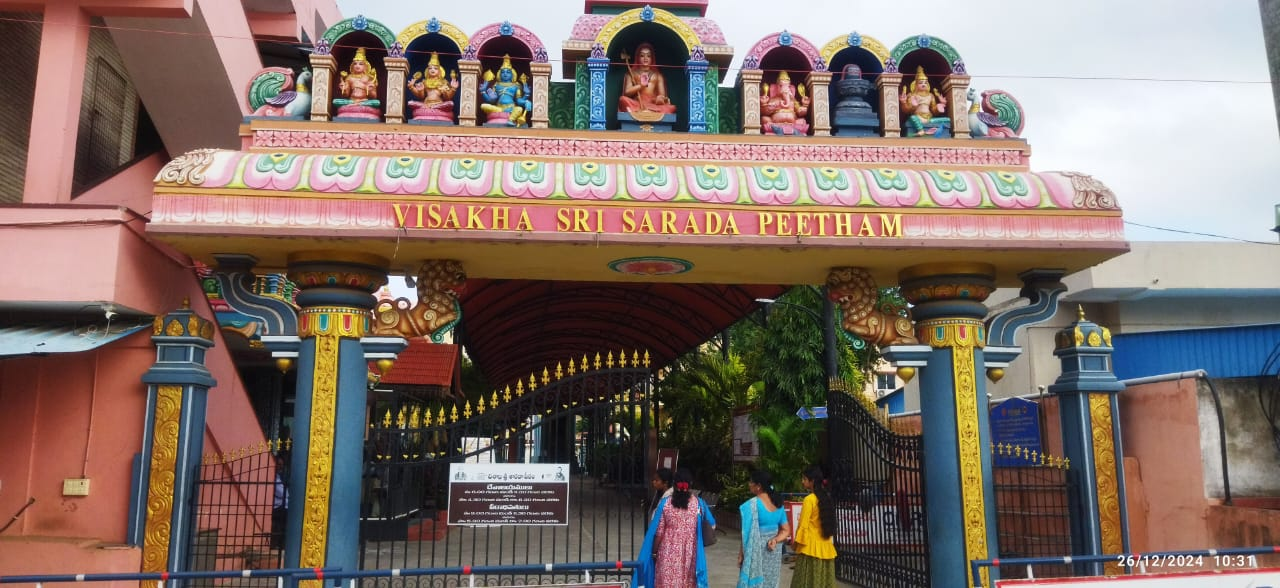

- Sri Sarada Peetham Location Vishaka Sri Sarada Peetham (Andhra Pradesh) Vishaka Sri Sarada Peetham (India)

Religion
- Affiliation: Hinduism
- Deity: Sri Sarada, Raja Shyamala Devi

Location
- Location: Chinnamushidiwada, Visakhapatnam
- State: Andhra Pradesh
- Country: India
- Interactive map of Vishaka Sri Sarada Peetham
- Coordinates: 17.808504°N 83.201384°E

Architecture
- Creator: Swaroopanandendra Saraswati
- Completed: 1997

Website
- www.srisaradapeetham.org

Vishaka Sri Sarada Peetham, also called the Sarada Peetham is a Hindu institution, located in Chinnamushidiwada, Visakhapatnam, Andhra Pradesh. It's dedicated to goddess Raja Shyamala Devi and Sri Sharada.

== About ==
This peetham was started by Swami Swaroopanandendra Saraswati in the year of 1997. Following its establishment other temples were added inside the peetham. India's only one temple of Raja Shyamala Devi, aka Matangi, is situated here. Concerning its history their website states: "In the true tradition of Guru Parampara, the lineage of preeminent preceptors, Sri Sri Sri Satchidānandendra Saraswati Swamy of Holenarasipura, Hassan district, Karnataka, ordered the transport of the following spiritual and devotional inventory – received as spiritual inheritance from his Guru Parampara and dating back to circa 600 AD – to establish a Peetham dedicated to Hindu Dharma in general and to Advaita Vedanta in specific at Chinamushidivada, Visakhapatnam. This inventory included, inter alia, the ceremonial idol (Utsava Vigraha) of Goddess Sri Sarada Swaroopa Rajasyamala, a quartz Siva Linga of Sri Chandramouliswara Swamy, an emerald Siva Linga, a śālagrām (a sacred stone worshipped by the devotees and supposed to be pervaded by the presence of Lord Vishnu), Sri Narasimha Swamy idol, and Sri Chakra. Sri Swaroopanandendra Saraswati Swamy established Visakha Sri Sarada Peetham using this spiritual paraphernalia." In Sri Vidya the deity of Raja Shyamala Devi is the minister of Tripura Sundari and ruler of the heart. She is the symbolic of the Crown, being at the summit of all the deities found at this complex:

- Raja Shyamala Devi
- Sri Medha Dakshina Murthy
- Sri Sarada Devi
- Ganapathi
- Adi Shankara
- Sri Vana Durga
- Sri Valli Deva Sena Shanmuka Subrahmanya Swamy
- Sri Dasa Anjaneya Swamy
- Sri Krishna
- Sri Datta Treya
- Sri Kala Bhairava
- Jammy Vruksham
- Naga Devatha
- Thandava Murthy

== Notable followers ==
Sarada Peetham is impact significant role in Andhra Pradesh and Telangana including both states Chief minister's are follower of this peetham.

- Y. S. Jaganmohan Reddy
- K. Chandrashekar Rao
- Ram Madhav
- T. Subbarami Reddy
- Suman
