= Abhinava Vidyatirtha =

35th Peetadhipathi of the Sringeri Sharada Peetham

His Holiness Jagadguru Shankaracharya Sri Abhinava Vidyatirtha Mahaswamiji Jyeshta Mahasannidhanam
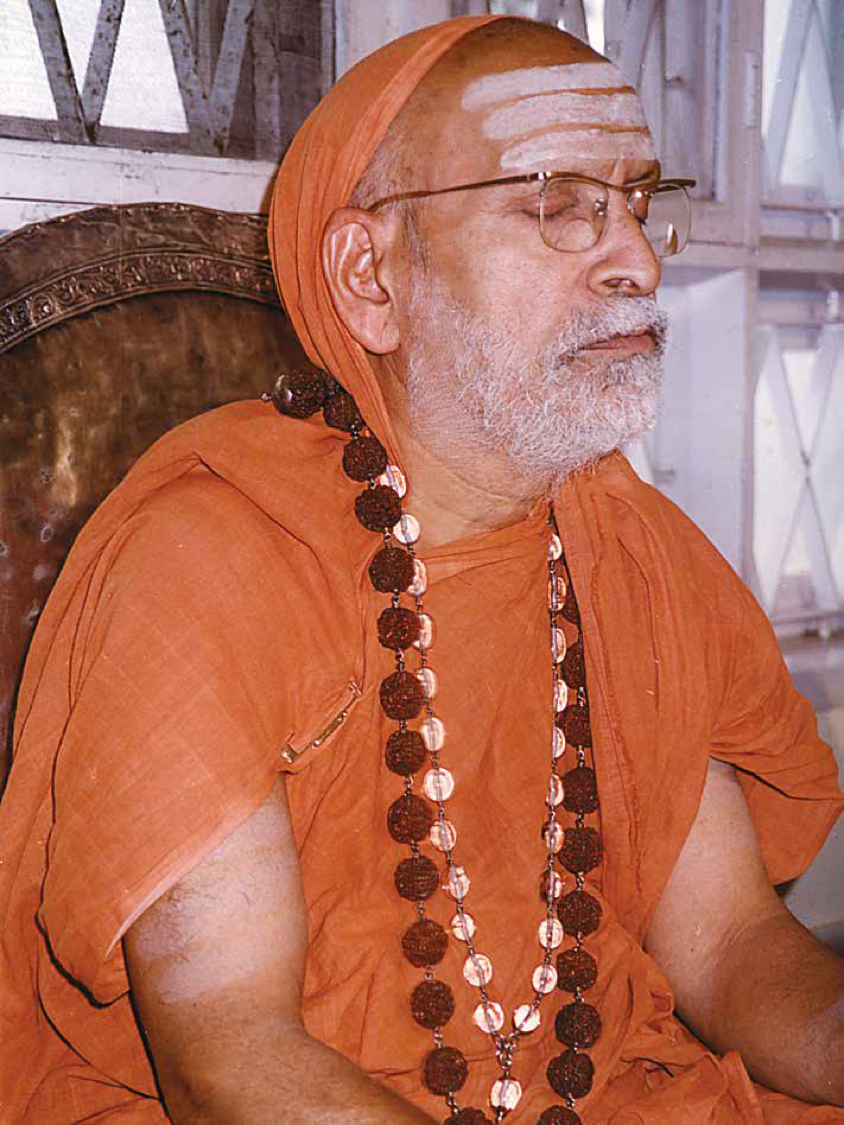
- Title: 35th Jagadguru Shankaracharya of Sringeri Sharada Peetham

Personal life
- Born: Srinivasa Sastri; 13 November 1917 Bangalore, India
- Died: 21 September 1989 Sringeri

Religious life
- Religion: Hinduism
- Philosophy: Advaita Vedanta
- Ordination: 22 May 1931

Sringeri Sharada Peetham
- In office 1931–1974
- Preceded by: Chandrashekhara Bharati III
- Succeeded by: Bharathi Tirtha

Jagadguru Abhinava Vidyatirtha Mahaswami (born as Srinivasa Sastri) (13 November 1917 – 21 September 1989) was the 35th Jagadguru of the Sringeri Sharada Peetham, which has been occupied by an unbroken lineage of gurus stretching back to the Advaitic philosopher Adi Shankaracharya, who established the matha for the propagation of Advaitha Vedanta.

== Childhood ==
He was born on 13 November 1917, Deepavali day to Venkatalakshmi Ammal and Rama Sastry, a primary school teacher in Bangalore. His childhood name was Srinivasa Shastri. His sacred thread ceremony was performed at Sringeri Sharada temple and he continued his vedic education at the Math. He slowly came under the influence of his Guru, Sri Chandrashekhara Bharathi Mahaswami.

== Embracing Sanyasa ==
Sri Chandrashekhara Bharati III Mahaswamigal announced his desire to appoint Srinivasa Sastry as the successor-designate (i.e., as the 35th Jagadguru acharya) and give him Sanyasa. He was just 14 years old at that time. The Shishya Sweekaram ceremony took place on the 22nd day of May, 1931 and the brahmachari received the saffron robes, the sacred staff and the kamandalu (water pot) from the acharya. The newly initiated sanyasi was given the Yogapatta Sri Abhinava Vidyatirtha in line with the Dashanami Sampradaya of Shri Adishankaracharya.

== Reign as Jagadguru ==
Sri Abhinava Vidyatirtha Mahaswamigal was a vedantin par excellence and an adept in Yoga as well. Under the tutelage of his Guru, he attained self-realization before he even reached 20 years of age.

On 26 September 1954, Sri Chandrasekhara Bharati shed his mortal coil. About 20 days later, on 16 October 1954, Sri Abhinava Vidya Tirtha took over as the 35th Jagadguru Shankaracharya of the Sringeri Sharada Peetham.

He was an able administrator and he is credited with bringing enormous changes in the functioning of the Math. He constructed a guest house for visitors to the Math. He renovated the Ammanavaru and Ganapati shrines in the Sharada temple, converted a huge bamboo forest into cultivable land, laid roads of access in Sringeri and introduced irrigation facilities. He initiated the work of constructing a bridge across the Tunga river in Sringeri, which is now called the Vidyatirtha Setu. Sharada Dhanvantari Hospital was constructed in Sringeri during his tenure. He established the Jnanodaya school and inaugurated it in April 1988.. He started an English magazine called Tattvaloka for proprogation of dharma.

In May 1979 he organized a historic meeting of the heads of all the four Maths established by Sri Adi Sankara - Sringeri, Puri, Dwarka and JoshiMath.

== Appointment of the successor ==
Sri Abhinava Vidyatirtha Mahaswamigal appointed the brahmachari Seetharama Anjaneyalu as his successor designate, i.e., the 36th Jagadguru of the Sringeri Sharada Peetham in 1974 and gave him the Yogapatta (monastic name) Sri Bharathi Teertha Mahaswami.

Sri Abhinava Vidyatirtha Mahaswami attained Mukti on 21 September 1989. His Adhishtanam is located in Narasimha Vana in Sringeri.

== Legacy ==
Sri Vidyateertha foundation was established in 1991 in his honour.

His life history has been chronicled in the book "The Multifaceted Jivanmukhta" by another disciple Sri R.M.Umesh.

An illustrated story book has been published in 4 languages.

== See also ==
- Sringeri Sharada Peetham
- Jagadguru of Sringeri Sharada Peetham
- Advaita Vedanta
- Adi Shankara
- Smartism
- Chandrashekhara Bharati III
- Vidyaranya
- Bharathi Teertha Mahaswami
