= Chandrashekhara Bharati III =

Indian Hindu monk (1892–1954)

His Holiness Jagadguru Shankaracharya Swami Shri Chandrashekhara Bharati
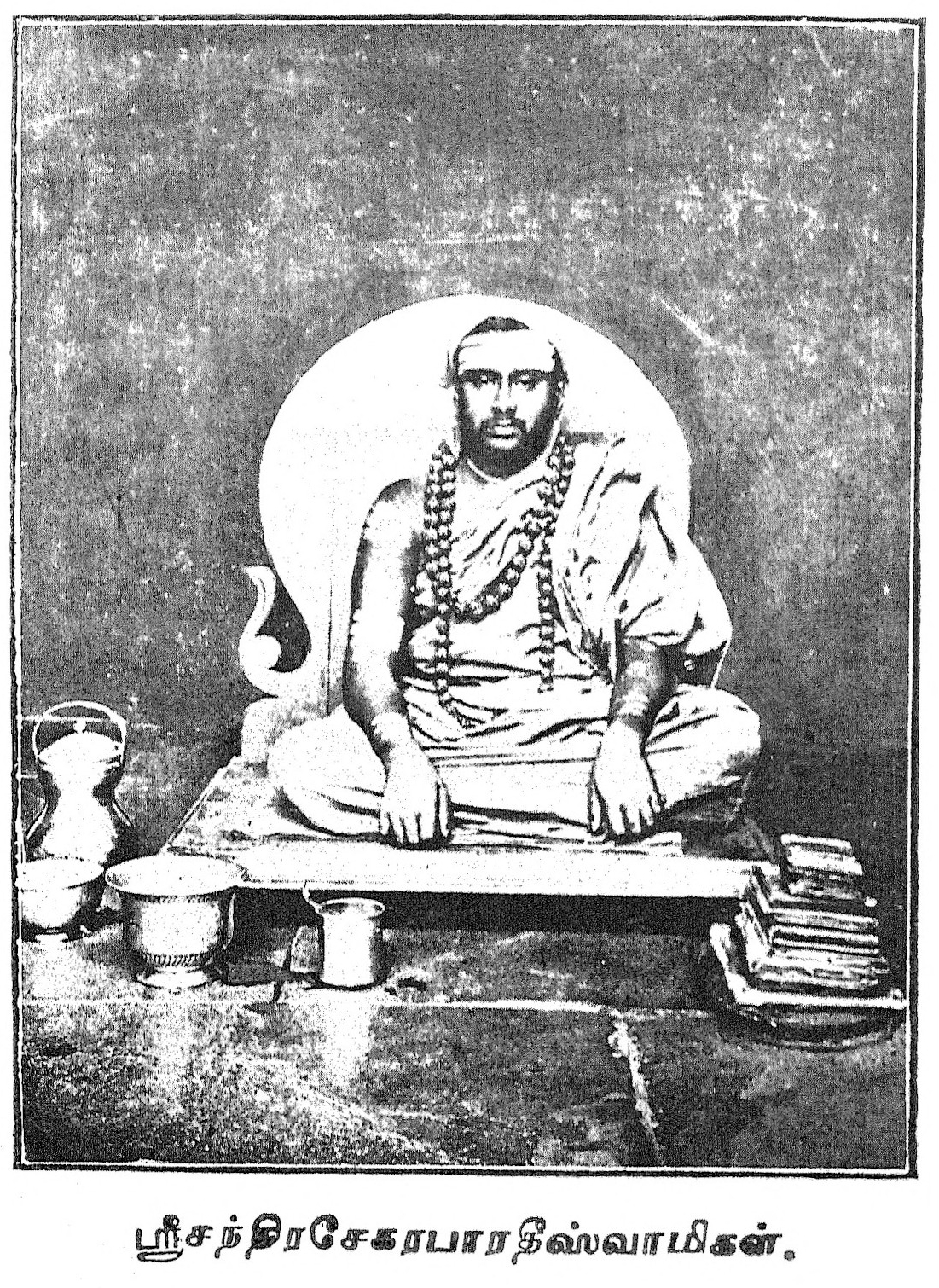
- Title: 34th Jagadguru Shankaracharya of Sringeri

Personal life
- Born: Narasimha Sastri; 16 October 1892 Sringeri, Kingdom of Mysore, British India
- Died: 26 September 1954 (aged 61) Sringeri, India
- Resting place: Narasimha vana sringeri

Religious life
- Religion: Hinduism
- Temple: Sringeri Sharada Peetham
- Philosophy: Advaita Vedanta
- Lineage: Dashanami Sampradaya
- Monastic name: Swami Chandrashekhara Bharati
- Ordination: April 7, 1912

Religious career
- Predecessor: Sachchidananda Shivabhinava Narasimha Bharati
- Successor: Abhinava Vidyatirtha

Swami Chandrasekhara Bharati (born Narasimha Sastri; 1892–1954) was the Jagadguru Sankaracarya of Sringeri Sharada Peetham in 1912–1954. He was one of the well known spiritual figures in Hinduism during the 20th century. He is considered a Jivanmukta (Sanskrit for one liberated while alive).

== Biography ==
Narasimha Sastri, who became Jagadguru Shankaraachaarya Swami Chandrashekhara Bharati was born to Gopala Sastri and Lakshmamma in Sringeri on Ashvayuja krishna Ekadashi (the eleventh day of the fortnight in the month of Ashvayuja) in the Hindu lunar year Nandana (corresponding to October 16, 1892). He was the last of his parents' twelve children and the only one who survived past infancy. A noted feature of his life was that his birth, upanayanam, sannyasa and videha mukti (death), all happened on Sundays.

=== Childhood days ===
The childhood days of Narasimha Sastri were passed in Sringeri. An introvert, social life held little attraction for him. He was lodged in the house of Srikanta Sastri, the then administrator of the Sringeri Matha. His parents performed the Choodakarma (a rite performed as one of the sixteen saṃskāras that enables one to go to school). He was then sent to the local Anglo-vernacular school run by the government.

His Brahmopadesha was performed when he was eight. He was regular in the performance of Sandhyavandanam three times a day, and Agnikarya, twice a day.

Narasimha, after his twelfth year, moved to Sadvidya Sanjivini Pathasala in Sringeri by the expressed wish of Swami Sacchidananda Sivabhinava Narasimha Bharati, the Jagadguru Sankaracarya, who kept a close watch over the progress of his ward.

=== Higher studies at Bangalore ===
The Sankaracarya of Sringeri had established in 1910 an institution of higher Vedantic training, the Bharatiya Girvana Prouda Vidya Vardhini Shala in Bangalore. Narasimha Sastri was chosen to be a student at that institution. Narasimha Sastri moved to Bangalore in 1911 with his parents and plunged into his studies. Mahamahopadhyaya Vellore Subrahmanya Sastri and Mimamsa Shiromani Vaidyanatha Sastri taught him Purva Mimamsa by texts such as the Bhatta Dipika. Mahamahopadhyaya Virupaksha Sastri taught him Vedanta. Even in Bangalore there was no change in Narasimha's introvertness. He spent his free time in the peaceful environs of the Gavigangadhareshwara Temple in Gavipuram, Bangalore.

=== Taking Sannyasa ===
In 1912, Jagadguru Sankaracarya Sacchidananda Sivabhinava Nrsimha Bharati named Narasimha Sastri as his successor at Sharada Peetham. A devotee, Rama Sastri, was entrusted with the task of personally delivering the Sankaracarya's letter naming his successor to Krishna Raja Wadiyar IV, Maharaja of Mysore. Before Narasimha Sastri arrived in Sringeri, the Sankaracarya attained Videha Mukti. So, on April 7, 1912, Narasimha Sastri was initiated into Sannyasa by Swami Satyananda Sarasvati and given the yoga patta of Swami Chandrasekhara Bharati. He received the saffron robes, the sacred staff, and the kamandala (water pot) from Satyananda. He was thus ordained in the dashanami tradition of Adi Shankaracharya.

=== Kumbhabhishekam and Digvijayam ===
In 1916, the Kumbhabhishekam (consecration) of the Sharada Temple in Sringeri was performed by Swami Chandrashekhara Bharati. In 1924, he left Sringeri on his first Digvijayam (tour). He first reached Mysore and consecrated a temple at the house of his Guru. It was named Abhinava Shankaralaya. Then, from Mysore, the Sankaracarya proceeded to Satyamangalam via Nanjanagud and Chamrajanagar. He then toured the southern parts of the Tamil country including Thirunelveli and Kanyakumari. He then toured Thiruvananthapuram and Kaladi in Travancore. At Kaladi, in 1927 he established a Vedanta Pathashala (an institution for higher studies in Vedanta). He then returned to Sringeri after visiting a few more places in Karnataka and Travancore.

=== Avadhuta Sthiti and naming his successor ===
After returning to Sringeri, Swami Chandrashekhara Bharati assumed the Avadhuta Sthiti (the state of being an Avadhuta). He was absorbed in the inward bliss of the Atma. To enable himself to spend more time in meditation and contemplation of the Self, he named a successor to the Peetham: a vatu named Srinivasa Sastri. On May 22, 1931, he initiated Srinivasa Sastri into Sannyasa and gave him the yoga patta of Sri Abhinava Vidyatirtha. In 1938, Swami Chandrashekhara Bharati undertook a yatra (pilgrimage) to Bangalore, Mysore and Kaladi. After returning to Sringeri, he resumed his classes on Vedanta and wrote thought-provoking and erudite articles in Asthikamathasanjeevini, a journal published by the Matha. He granted interviews to genuine seekers and gave darshan to the public.

=== Final years and videha mukti ===
After 1945, Swami Chandrashekhara Bharati gradually withdrew from all activities. However, his fame had spread far and wide. On August 24, 1954, the first President of India, Dr. Rajendra Prasad, visited Sringeri to pay homage to the Sankaracharya. The President, a pious man having deep faith in the Hindu scriptures, discussed with Swami Chandrashekhara Bharathi in Sanskrit itself, on Dharma and other allied subjects.

A few days later, the Jagadguru took samadhi. On Sunday, September 26, 1954, he got up early in the morning and walked towards Tunga River; a servant followed at a slight distance. He stepped into the water without heeding the servant's warning about the depth of water at that spot, and advancing further into the current had a dip. Then he did Pranayama, and dipped again. The servant saw the Acharya's body floating down the current. In consternation the servant plunged into the river, caught hold of the Acharya, but in the effort lost his consciousness. A gentleman who happened to hear the shouts of the servant, brought the two ashore. The servant was soon restored to life but ‘nothing could be done in the other case’. It was reported that his body was in an erect sitting posture with legs crossed as at the time of contemplation and was straightened out only in an attempt to restore respiration and that there was no sign of drowning or of suffocation or of any struggles for life. The Jagadguru's mortal remains found their resting place in a samadhi just by the side of that of his great guru in Narasimhavanam. The anniversary of the day will ever fall on the Mahalaya New Moon day, the day of the annual Abhiseka of Sri Sharada preparatory to the Navaratri celebrations. His birth, Upanayanam, Sanyasa and Videha Mukti were all on Sundays.

== Works ==
Swami Chandrashekhara Bharati composed a few poems and wrote a famous commentary. His main works are:

- Gururaja Sukti Malika containing 36 compositions in about 400 pages. Printed in Sanskrit and Tamil
- Sri Sharada Dandakam in Sanskrit, extolling the presiding deity of Sringeri- Sri Sharadamba
- Bhashya (commentary) on Vivekachoodamani, an Advaita treatise attributed to Sri Adyashankaracharya

== See also ==
- Sringeri Sharada Peetham
- Jagadguru of Sringeri Sharada Peetham
- Advaita Vedanta
- Adi Shankara
- Abhinava Vidyatirtha
- Smartism

== Notes ==
Preceded by Sachchidananda Shivabhinava Narasimha Bharati	Jagadguru of Sringeri Sharada Peetham; 1912 – 1954	Succeeded by Abhinava Vidyatirtha
