= Sringeri Sharada Peetham =

Advaita Vedanta Hindu monastery with temples

- Sringeri Sharada Peetham logo

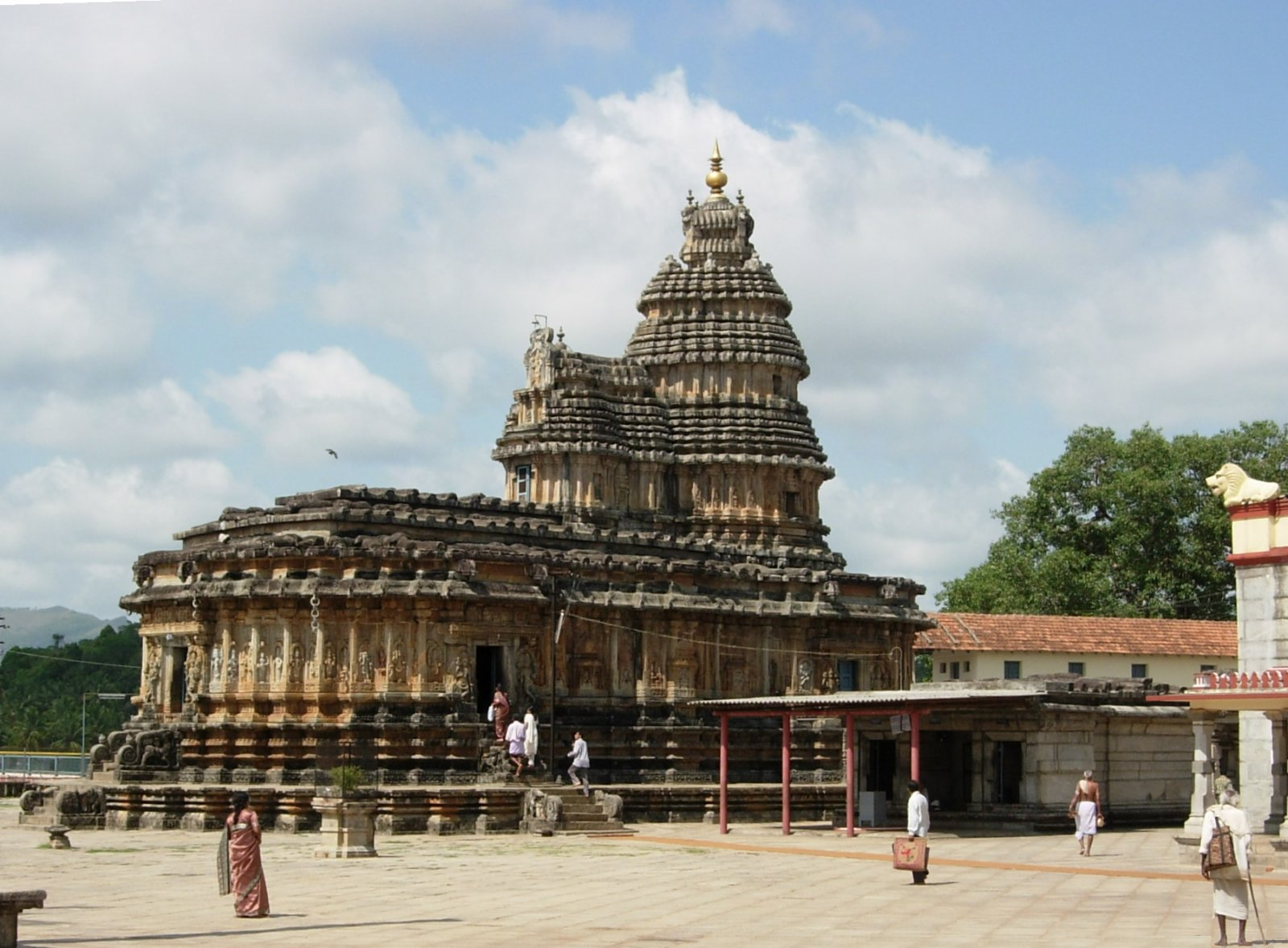
- Vidyashankara Temple at Sringeri completed in 1338
- Founder: Adi Shankara
- Location: Sringeri, Karnataka, India
- Coordinates: 13.416519°N 75.251972°E
- First Shankaracharya: Sureshvaracharya
- Present Shankaracharya: Bharati Tirtha
- Website: https://www.sringeri.net/

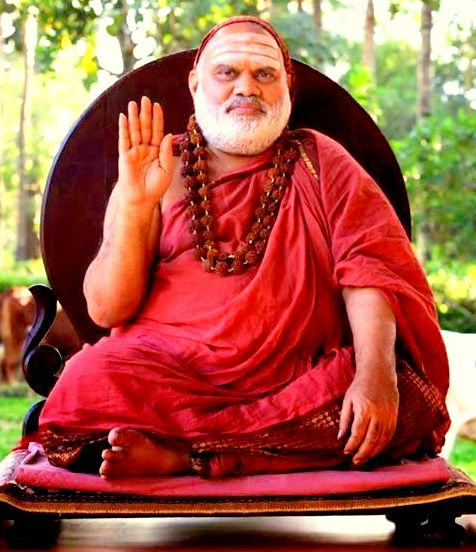
H.H. Jagadguru Shankaracharya Sri Sri Bharati Tirtha Mahasannidhanam, The Shankaracharya of Sringeri Sharada Peetham Math

Dakṣiṇāmnāya Śrī Śāradā Pīṭham (IPA: [d̪ɐkʂiɳaːmn̪aːjɐ ɕriː ɕaːrɐd̪ɐ piːʈʰɐm]) or Śri Śṛṅgagiri Maṭha (IPA: [ɕriː ɕr̩ŋɡɐɡiri mɐʈʰɐ]); Sanskrit: मठ, maṭha) is one of the four cardinal pīthams following the Daśanāmi Sampradaya. The peetham or matha is traditionally believed to have been established by Ādi Śaṅkara to preserve and propagate Sanātana Dharma and Advaita Vedānta, the doctrine of non-dualism. Located in Śringerī in Chikmagalur district in Karnataka, India, it is the Southern Āmnāya Pīṭham amongst the four Chaturāmnāya Pīthams, with the others being the Dvārakā Śāradā Pītham (Gujarat) in the West, Purī Govardhana Pīṭhaṃ (Odisha) in the East, Badri Jyotishpīṭhaṃ (Uttarakhand) in the North. The head of the matha is called Shankaracharya, the title derives from Adi Shankara.

The peetham is situated on the banks of the Tuṅgā River in Śringerī. The northern bank of the river Tunga houses three prominent shrines dedicated to Śrī Śāradā, Śrī Ādi Śaṅkara, and Jagadguru Śrī Vidyāśankara Tīrtha, the 10th Jagadguru of the Pītham. The southern bank houses the residence of the reigning pontiff, the adhisthānam shrines of the previous pontiffs, and the Sadvidyā Sañjīvini Samskrita Mahāpāthashālā.

The Pītham is traditionally headed by an ascetic pontiff belonging to the order of the Jagadguru Śankarāchārya. According to tradition, the first pontiff of the Pītham was Śrī Ādi Śaṅkara's eldest disciple, Śrī Sureshvarāchārya, renowned for his treatises on Vedānta - Mānasollāsa and Naishkarmya-Siddhi. The current pontiff, Śrī Bhārathī Tīrtha Svāmin is the 36th Jagadguru in the since-unbroken spiritual succession of pontiffs.

The Pītham is one of the major Hindu institutions that has historically coordinated Smārta tradition and monastic activities through satellite institutions in South India, preserved Sanskrit literature and pursued Advaita studies. The Pītham runs several vedic schools (pathashalas), maintains libraries and repositories of historic Sanskrit manuscripts. The Śringerī Mutt has been active in preserving Vedas, sponsoring students and recitals, Sanskrit scholarship, and celebrating traditional annual festivals such as Śaṅkara Jayanti and Guru Purnima (Vyāsa Pūrnima). The Pītham has branches across India and maintains temples at several locations. It also has a social outreach programme.

== Location ==
Sri Sharada Peetham is located in Sringeri about 85 kilometres (53 mi) east of Udupi and 100 kilometres (62 mi) northeast from Mangaluru across the Western Ghats, and about 335 kilometres (208 mi) west-northwest from the state capital, Bengaluru. Sringeri can be reached from Bangalore and Mangalore via road.

== History ==
=== Establishment ===
==== Traditional accounts ====
According to tradition, Adi Shankara, the principal exponent of Advaita Vedanta, established four pithams (dioceses) in India to preserve and propagate Sanatana Dharma and Advaita Vedanta. These are Sringeri Sri Sharada Peetham (Karnataka, South), Dvārakā Śāradā Pītham (Gujarat, West), Purī Govardhan Pīṭhaṃ (Odisha, East), and Badri Jyotishpīṭhaṃ (Uttarakhand, North).

A hagiographic legend states that Adi Shankara, during His travels across India, witnessed a snake unveiling its hood like an umbrella to shield a pregnant frog from the hot sun on the banks of the river Tunga in Sringeri. Deducing that non-violence amongst natural predators was innate to a holy spot, Adi Shankara decided to establish His first Peetham in Sringeri. Sringeri is independently associated with Sage Rishyasringa of Ramayana fame, son of Sage Vibhandaka.

According to tradition, Shankara also instituted the tradition of appointing a succession of monastic pontifical heads, called the Jagadgurus, to each of the four monasteries, installing Sri Sureshvaracharya, Sri Hastamalakacharya, Sri Padmapadacharya and Sri Totakacharya as the first Jagadgurus of the Peethams at Sringeri, Dvaraka, Puri and Badri respectively. According to tradition, Adi Shankara installed Sri Sureshwaracharya, believed by tradition to be the same as Maṇḍana Miśra, as the first acharya of the Peetham at Sringeri before resuming his tour to establish the three remaining Peethams at Puri, Dwaraka and Badarinath. The math holds one of the four Mahavaakyas, Aham-Bramhasmi. The math claims to have a lineage of Jagadgurus, stretching back straight to Adi Shankara himself. The present and 36th Jagadguru acharya of this peetham is Jagadguru Sri Sri Bharathi Teertha Mahaswami. His guru was Jagadguru Sri Abhinava Vidyatirtha Mahaswami. The successor-designate (the 37th Jagadguru acharya) was appointed in 2015, and was given the Yogapatta (monastic name) Sri Vidhushekhara Bharati Mahaswami.

==== Historical accounts ====
While tradition attributes the establishment of the Sringeri Sharada Peetham to Adi Shankara, the early history of the Sringeri Peetham from Shankara (8th century CE) to about the 14th century is unknown. This may be because the sources are contradictory about the dates and events, in part because of the loss of records, and also because the pontiffs of the monastery adopted the same name which has created confusion in understanding the surviving records.

The early inscriptions that mention Sringeri, in the regional Kannada language, are donative or commemorative. Though useful in establishing the significance of the matha, they lack details to help establish the early history.According to Hermann Kulke, the early history of Sringeri is unknown but the earliest historical evidence which dates from the 12th century shows that it was a centre of Jainism.According to Paul Dundas, although Sringeri is traditionally famed as the location where Sankara established his first Hindu monastery in the ninth century, it was originally a Jain centre that was taken over by Hindus in the fourteenth century and fitted out with a spurious history. According to Paul Hacker, no mention of the mathas can be found before the 14th century CE. Until the 15th century, the timespan of the directors of Sringeri Math are unrealistically long, spanning 60+ or even 105 years. After 1386, these timespans become much shorter. According to Hacker, these mathas were probably established in the 14th century, to propagate Shankara's view of Advaita., However most of the other scholars like Goodding concur with Hacker on the prominence of Sringeri matha in the Vijayanagara Empire, but argue that Sringeri matha already existed, but rapidly gained prominence in the second half of the 14th century.

=== Vijayanagara Empire - Vidyaranya ===
The history of Sringeri Peetha is recorded in the matha's literature as well as in kadatas (ledger records and inscriptions of various forms) and sanads (charters) from the 14th century onwards.

A pivotal figure in the history of the matha is Vidyaranya (sometimes referred to as Madhava Vidyaranya or Madhavacharya) who was an ideological support and the intellectual inspiration for the founders of the Vijayanagara Empire. He helped Harihara I and his brother Bukka to build a Hindu army to overthrow the Muslim rule in the Deccan region, and re-establish a powerful Hindu kingdom from Hampi. In his counsel, the Vijayanagara founders lead an expansive conquest of much of the southern Indian peninsula, taking over lands from the Sultanates that had formed after several invasions by the Delhi Sultanate. According to tradition, the monk's efforts were supported by the 10th and 11th pontiff of Sringeri peetham. Vidyaranya later became the 12th acharya of the Sringeri peetham in 1375 CE. Shortly after the start of the Vijayanagara empire in 1336 CE, the rulers began building the Vidyashankara temple at the Sringeri peetham site. This temple was completed in 1338. The Vijayanagara rulers repaired and built numerous more Hindu and Jain temples in and around the Sringeri matha and elsewhere in their empire. This is a period where numerous inscriptions help establish the existence of the Sringeri peetham from the 14th century onwards.

The Vijayanagara rulers Harihara and Bukka gave a sarvamanya (tax-exempt) gift of land in and around Sringeri in 1346 CE to the Sringeri matha guru Bharati Tirtha, in a manner common in the Indian tradition for centuries, to help defray the costs of operating the monastery and temples. The grant is evidenced by a stone inscription by the king who reverentially refers to the 10th pontiff of Sringeri matha as a guru (counsellor, teacher). This grant became a six-century tradition that ended in the 1960s and 1970s when the Indian central government introduced and enforced a land-reform law that redistributed the land. The Vijayanagara empire gift also began a regional philanthropic tradition of endowments by the wealthy and the elderly population to the Sringeri matha. The matha managed the land and therefore operated as a sociopolitical network and land-grant institution for over 600 years beyond its religious role and spiritual scholarship. This relationship between the monastery and the regional population has been guided by a mutual upcara (hospitality, appropriate conduct) guideline between the matha and the populace. According to Leela Prasad, this upcara has been guided by the Hindu Dharmasutras and Dharmasastras texts preserved and interpreted by the matha, one composed by a range of authors and generally dated to be from the second half of the 1st-millennium BCE through about 400 CE.

In the late 15th century, the patronage of the Vijayanagara kings shifted to Vaisnavism. Following this loss of patronage, Sringeri matha had to find other means to propagate its former status, and the story of Shankara establishing the four cardinal mathas may have originated in the 16th century. However, this does not apply to sringeri matha since the madhaviya Sankaravijaya and other earliest biographies give a general description of the establishment of mathas, at Sringeri and other places, but they do not specifically mention the number 'four'.

According to Shastri, following the traditional accounts, the Vijayanagara kings visited the Sringeri monastery many times over some 200 years and left inscriptions praising the monks, revering their knowledge of the Vedas and their scholarship. The monastery also provided the Vijayanagara empire administration with guidance on governance. The descendant rulers of the Vijayanagara empire regularly visited the monastery and made a series of endowments to the Sringeri matha as evidenced by various inscriptions. They also established the agrahara of Vidyaranyapuram with a land grant for the Brahmins, and in the 15th century established the earliest version of the Saradamba temple found at the Sringeri peetham site. The tradition of establishing satellite institutions under the supervision of the Sringeri peetham started in the Vijayanagara empire period. For example, Vidyaranya organized a matha in Hampi.

=== Keladi era ===
After the defeat of the Vijayanagara empire and the destruction of Hampi by a coalition of Deccan sultanates, the Vijayanagara empire territories faced a political turmoil. The Deccan region was largely divided among five Islamic sultanates. The coastal regions of Karnataka that included the Sringeri matha ultimately came under the control of the Nayakas of Keladi from the Lingayatism tradition, who has previously served as governors for the Vijayanagara emperors. The Keladi dynasty supported the Sringiri peetham for nearly 250 years, from 1499 to 1763, when the Keladi Nayakas rule was ended by Hyder Ali seeking to create a sultanate from Mysore.

The Sringeri matha received gifts and grants from the Keladi Nayakas, as evidenced by ledger records and literature preserved by the monastery, especially during the reign of Sri Sri Sacchidananda Bharati I as the head of the Math. Unlike the copious epigraphical evidence from the Vijayanagara era, few inscriptions from the Keladi era history are available and the history of this period is mostly discernible from the literary records. The lands held by the monastery and the goods meant for its operation were treated by the Nayakas as tax-exempt and not subject to any tariffs. Additionally, the 17th-century records show that the matha received special gifts from the Lingayat rulers on festive occasions such as acharavicharas and Diwali. Some of the Nayaka princes studied at a school run by the monastery.

=== Maratha era ===
The Sringeri matha was supported by the Maratha rulers when they came to power in the post-Aurangzeb Mughal era. The monastery provided the Marathas with counsel in return as evidenced by over two dozen letters, mostly in the Marathi language and some in Sanskrit using Kannada script. These have been preserved by the monastery. According to the letters and ledger entries, the Maratha rulers delivered gifts and bestowed grants to the monastery between 1738 and 1894. The letters of the Maratha rulers are typically in Marathi, while the replies from the Sringeri pontiff are in Sanskrit. In addition to these records, the monastery literature mention land grants from the Marathas as well as records of the visit by the jagadguru (pontiff) to Maratha ruled regions and towns such as Pune and Nasik.

The religio-political significance of the Sringeri monastery was such that both the Marathas and the Muslim ruler Hyder Ali sought "cordial relations" with it. According to Leela Prasad, after the Maratha ruler Raghunatha Rao invited the Sringeri matha's Jagadguru to visit him and the pontiff accepted the invitation, when Hyder Ali – whose hostility to the Marathas had been legendary – heard about the trip, Hyder Ali sent the Jagadguru gifts and an escort consisting of a palanquin, five horses, an elephant and cash for the travel expenses.

==== Peshwa Maratha sacking of the temple in 1791 ====
After the Third Anglo–Mysore War in 1791, a group of Pindaris associated with the Maratha forces passed through Sringeri and looted the monastery temples of their gold and copper, damaged images, and killed some Brahmin priests. The incident became known through a series of letters sent by Tipu Sultan to the Sringeri Jagadguru. After being aware of the attack, Tipu Sultan sent funds for repairs and restoration, and in one letter requested that the Jagadguru perform rituals for "good showers and crops".

Scholars have offered differing interpretations of these events. Leela Prasad views Tipu Sultan’s correspondence as an instance of religious tolerance and as reflecting the predatory actions of some irregulars in the Maratha army, while A. K. Shastri emphasises the subsequent reconciliation and restoration efforts by the Maratha leadership. Shastri records that the Sringeri pontiff protested by fasting on the banks of the Tunga River and that, upon learning of the attack, the Maratha Peshwa ordered the recovery of the stolen items and their return to the monastery with compensation. In the following years relations between the Sringeri monastery and the Maratha rulers were restored. Leela Prasad, however, notes that the culprits were never identified and that there is no record of compensation being paid.

=== British rule ===
The Sringeri monastery has been a historic politico-religious center at least from the 14th century. Along with the Vijayanagara emperors and the Mysore Muslim rulers such as Hyder Ali and Tipu Sultan, the colonial British authorities and their Nayak and Wodeyar dynasty appointees considered the monastery to be a strategically important hub for regional politics. Its operations were a target of surveillance, its collection of Hindu texts on Dharma and its counsel given its regional significance were sought by the British authorities.

== Monastery buildings ==
=== Temples ===
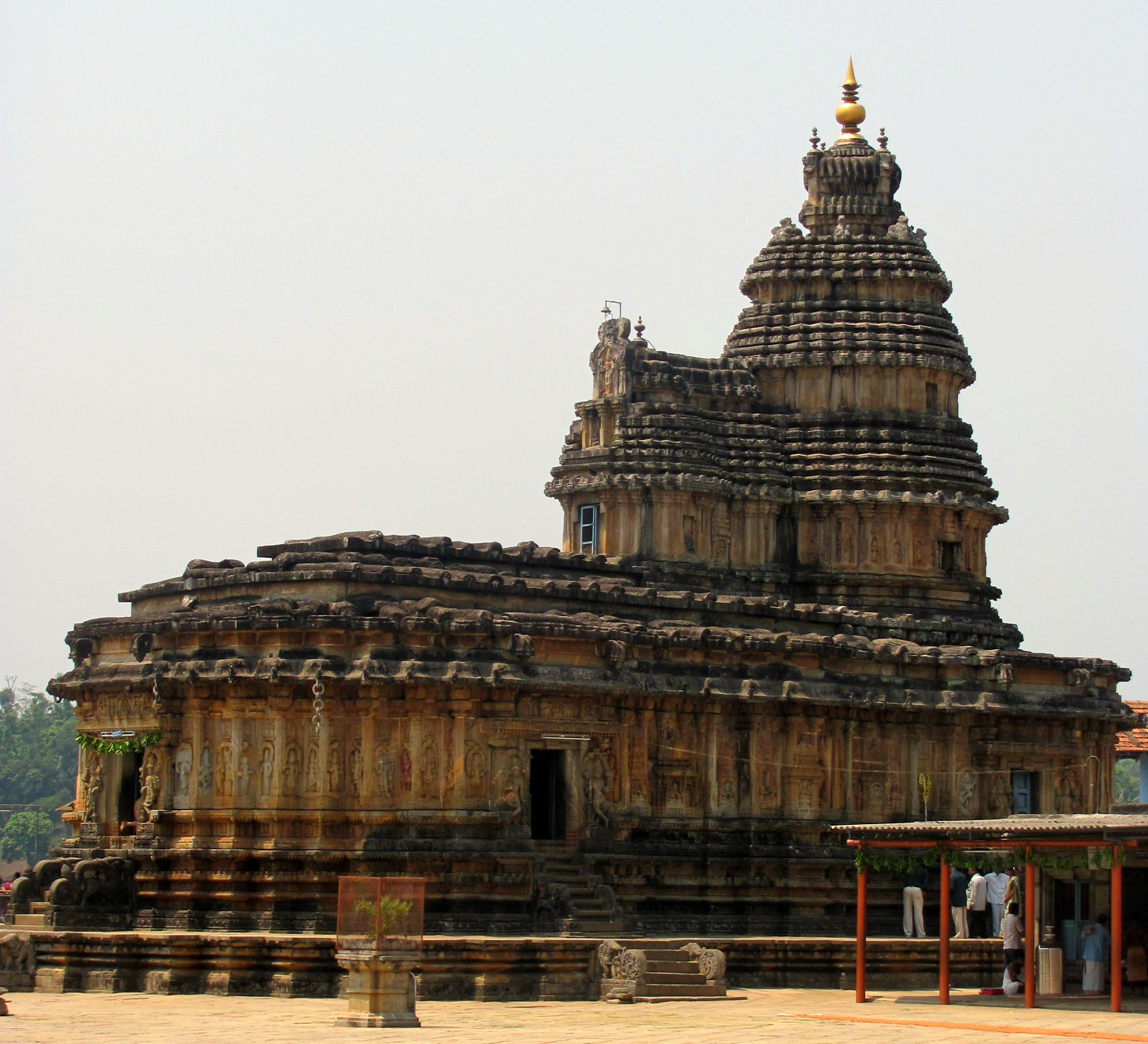
Vidyashankara temple at Sringeri Peetham

The Sringeri matha includes two major temples. One is dedicated to Shiva and is called the Vidya Shankara temple, the other to Saraswati and is called the Sharada Amba temple. The earliest version of the Shiva temple was built in the 14th century, of goddess Saraswati in the 15th century.

The Vidyashankara temple is a fusion of pre-Vijayanagara Hindu temple architecture traditions with Hoysalas and Vijayanagara styles, giving it an unusual appearance. The temple has an apsidal shape with its interior chambers and sanctum set on the square principle while the spire and outer walls use an almost circular plan. The temple is set on a high plinth like the Hoysala temples, with the basement adorned with sculpted animals and balustrades with yalis flanking the steps. The outer walls of the Shiva temple have large sculptured panels at right angles to each other and these show the major gods and goddess of Vedic tradition and post-Vedic Shaivism, Vaishnavism, Shaktism, Saurism (Surya) and Ganapatya (Ganesha) traditions of Hinduism. The base of the temple have relief friezes depicting a large variety of stories from Hindu epics and Puranas. The sanctum has a linga, the southern side of the sanctum features Brahma-Sarawati, the western side Vishnu-Lakshmi, and the northern side Shiva-Parvati.

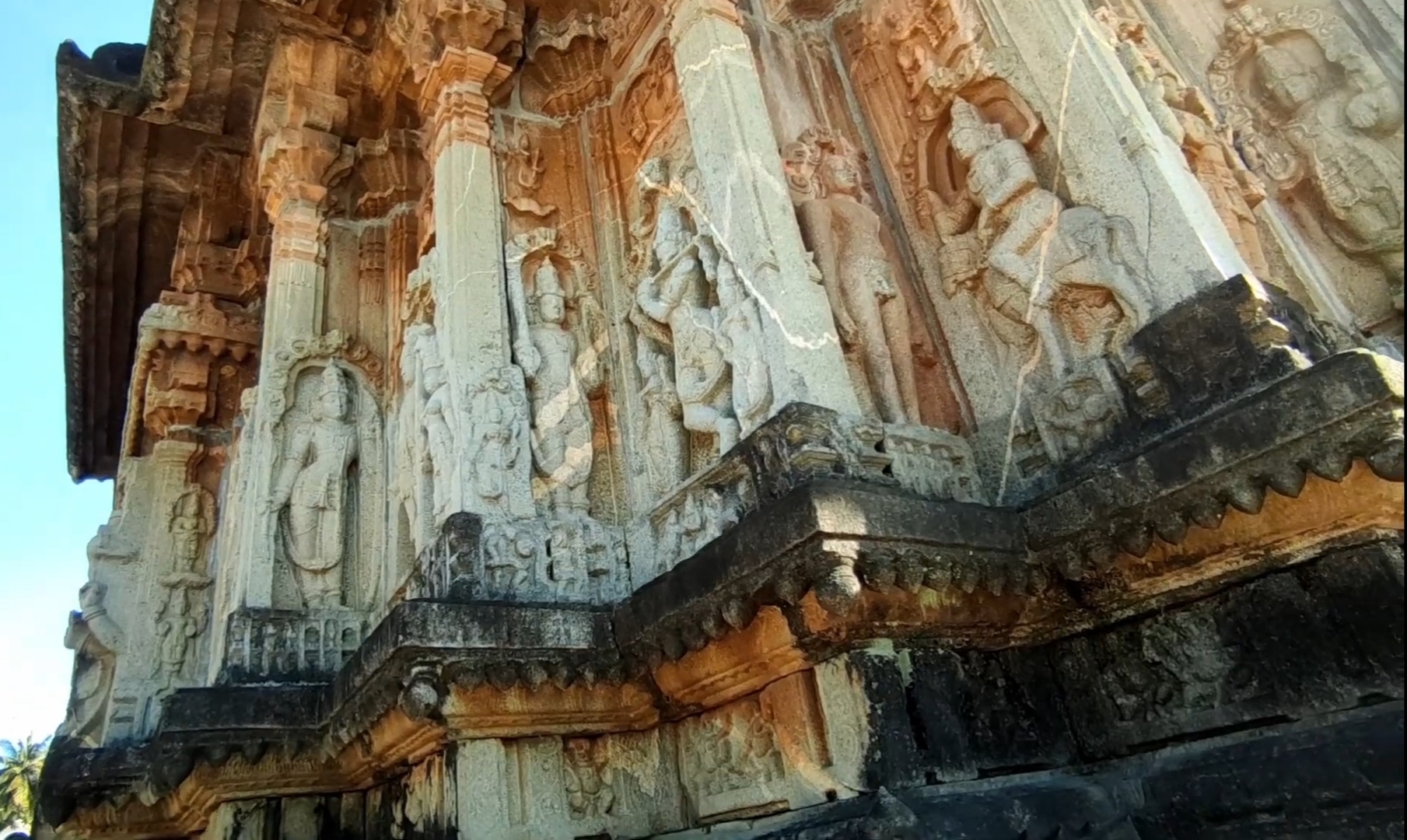
Dashavatara panel showing Arihant (Jainism) Rishabhanatha (fourth relief from right) in a syncretic compromise with Jainism

The temple can be entered from four directions. Inside the temple is a large mandapa with intricately carved pillars, several antechambers with artwork, a sanctum with linga and a circumambulation passageway around it. The passageway opens to smaller shrines dedicated to Hindu gods and goddesses from various Hindu traditions. According to George Michell, the current Vidyashankara temple reflects the 16th-century additions.

Saraswati, the goddess of knowledge and arts in the Hindu tradition, is the presiding deity of the monastery. The monastery tradition states that Adi Shankara installed a sandalwood image of Saraswati as Sharadamba in a simple shrine, one that was replaced with its current copy in gold by the 11th acharya of Sringeri sharada peetham, Sri Barathi Thirtha in the Vijayanagara era. The shrine was rebuilt in the 15th century and expanded in the early 20th century. The temple has a maha-mandapa (main hall) with images of saptamatrikas (seven mothers) sculpted. The goddess sits in a golden chariot.The golden chariot was dedicated to goddess in 1999 by the present acharya of Sringeri sharada peetham. Along with Saraswati in the sanctum, the temple has small shrines for Ganesha and for Bhuvaneshvari. The Sharadamba temple and nearby structures additionally house a library, a Vedic school, a shrine for Adi Shankara, and other facilities of the monastery. It has been the historic epicenter of Sringeri's annual Navaratri festival celebrations, as well as the chariot festival held in February or March every year. The temple also gives the site its name, with "Sarada peetha" meaning "seat of learning". The temple 's small gopuram was built in Chettinad structures by 33rd acharya of Sringeri sharada peetham Sachitananda Shivabinava Narasimha Barathi Mahaswamiji, the temple was consecrated by 34th acharya of Sringeri sharada peetham Chandrasekara Barathi Mahaswamiji in 1916.

=== Library ===
Sringeri matha has preserved and been a source of ancient Sanskrit manuscripts to scholars. In the contemporary monastery, a library is located on the first floor of the Saradamba temple. It has about 500 palm-leaf manuscripts and a large collection of paper manuscripts, most of which are in Sanskrit. These manuscripts are not only related to Advaita philosophy, but to classical subjects such as Sanskrit grammar, Dharmasutras, ethics, and arts.

== Organization ==
The Sringeri Sharada Peetham, over its centuries of operations has evolved a structure to manage the monastery, its succession and its branches. Some of the key positions and features include:

- Jagadguru (lit. "teacher of mankind") is the pontiff, both in spiritual and secular sense. A celibate ascetic by tradition, he leads the learning institutions within the monastery and worship festivals. In case of differing views on the operation of monastery, his decision is considered by the monks as binding. He is also responsible for screening, studying and selecting the candidate monk who will succeed him as the next pontiff.
- Samsthana is the administrative organization that has historically managed the monastery resources, properties and endowments in accordance with historic policies and guidelines. This includes the temples, the Vedic schools, the library, the kitchen and free feeding houses for the monks and visiting pilgrims at Sringeri and other branches of the Sringeri Sharada Peetham. Prior to the 1970s change in Indian law, the Samsthana responsibilities included managing the extensive lands and its tenants.
- The monastery has a number of officials with various duties. The sarvadhikari is the administrative superintendent and the parupatyagara is the manager of temples, the amildar (revenue collector from tenants on the monastery land grants), the senubova (the finance officer), the bokkasta (treasurer), achara-vichara (conduct and ethical behavior of monks), the rayasadavas (letter writers and certified messengers for pontiff's official correspondence) and others. Since the geo-political disturbances in the 18th century, the monastery added the position of subedar (legal officer who coordinated law and justice issues with the king's administration) and killedar (police officer).

The Sringeri Sharada Peetham has a network of branches in India. Some of the major branches include those in Varanasi, Haridwar, Nasik, Gaya, Mysore, Hyderabad, Madurai, Chennai, Kanchipuram, Tirupati, Coimbatore, Ramesvaram, Kalady, Ramnad and Bengaluru. The monastery also supervises a number of Vedic studies and Sanskrit schools in various parts of India. The monastery owns some agriculture land and this is farmed by the monks and monastery workers.

== Modern era Jagadgurus ==
Jagadguru Vidhushekhara Bharati was appointed as Uttaradhikari of the Sringeri Sharada Peetham by Jagadguru Bharathi Teertha Mahaswami on 23 January 2015. The last five Jagadgurus were:

Name	Years as Jagadguru	Place of birth	Purvashrama name	Picture
Sri Sachchidananda Shivabhinava Narasimha Bharati Mahaswami	1872–1912	Mysore	Shivaswami	
Sri Chandrashekhara Bharati III Mahaswami	1912–1954	Kunigal	Narasimha Shastri	
Sri Abhinava Vidyatirtha Mahaswami	1954–1989	Bangalore	Srinivasa Shastri	
Sri Bharati Tirtha Mahaswami	1989 – present	Machilipatnam	Tangirala Sitarama Anjaneyulu	
Sri Vidhushekhara Bharati Mahaswami (Successor-designate)	2015–present	Tirupati	Kuppa Venkateshwara Prasad Sharma	

== Gallery ==
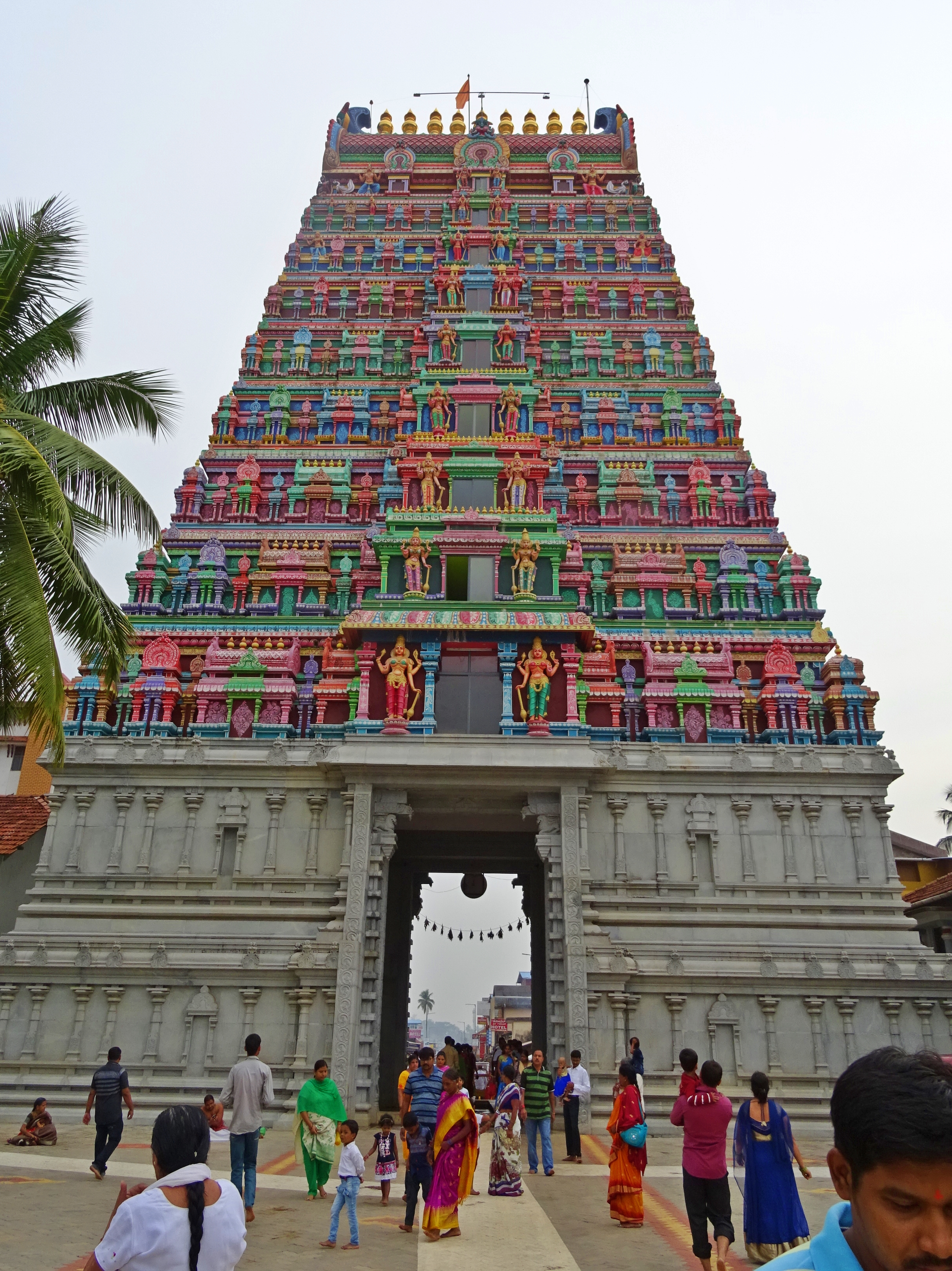
The Raja Gopura of Sringeri Sharada Peetham

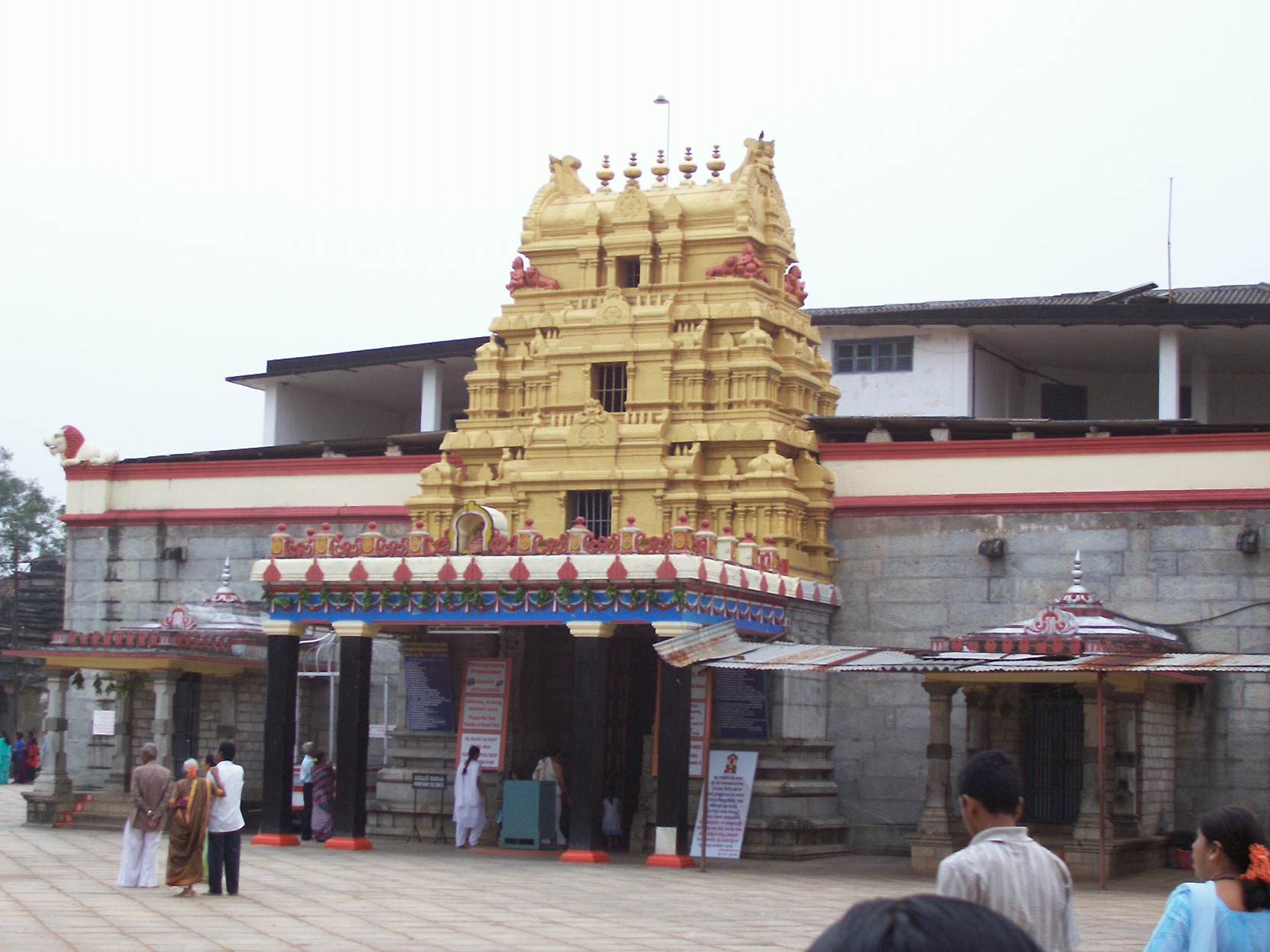
The Main Sharada Temple of Sringeri

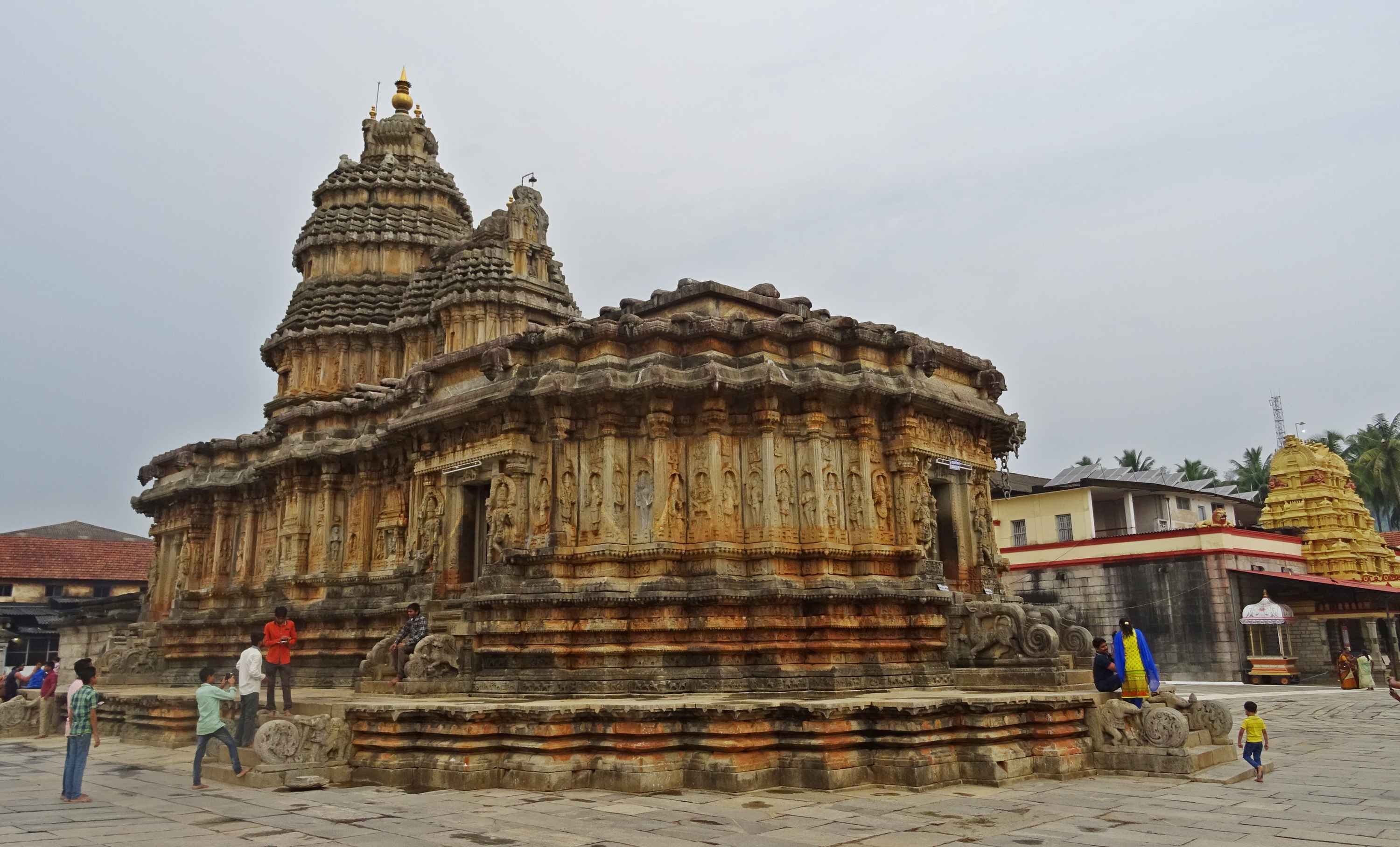
Shri Vidyashankara Temple

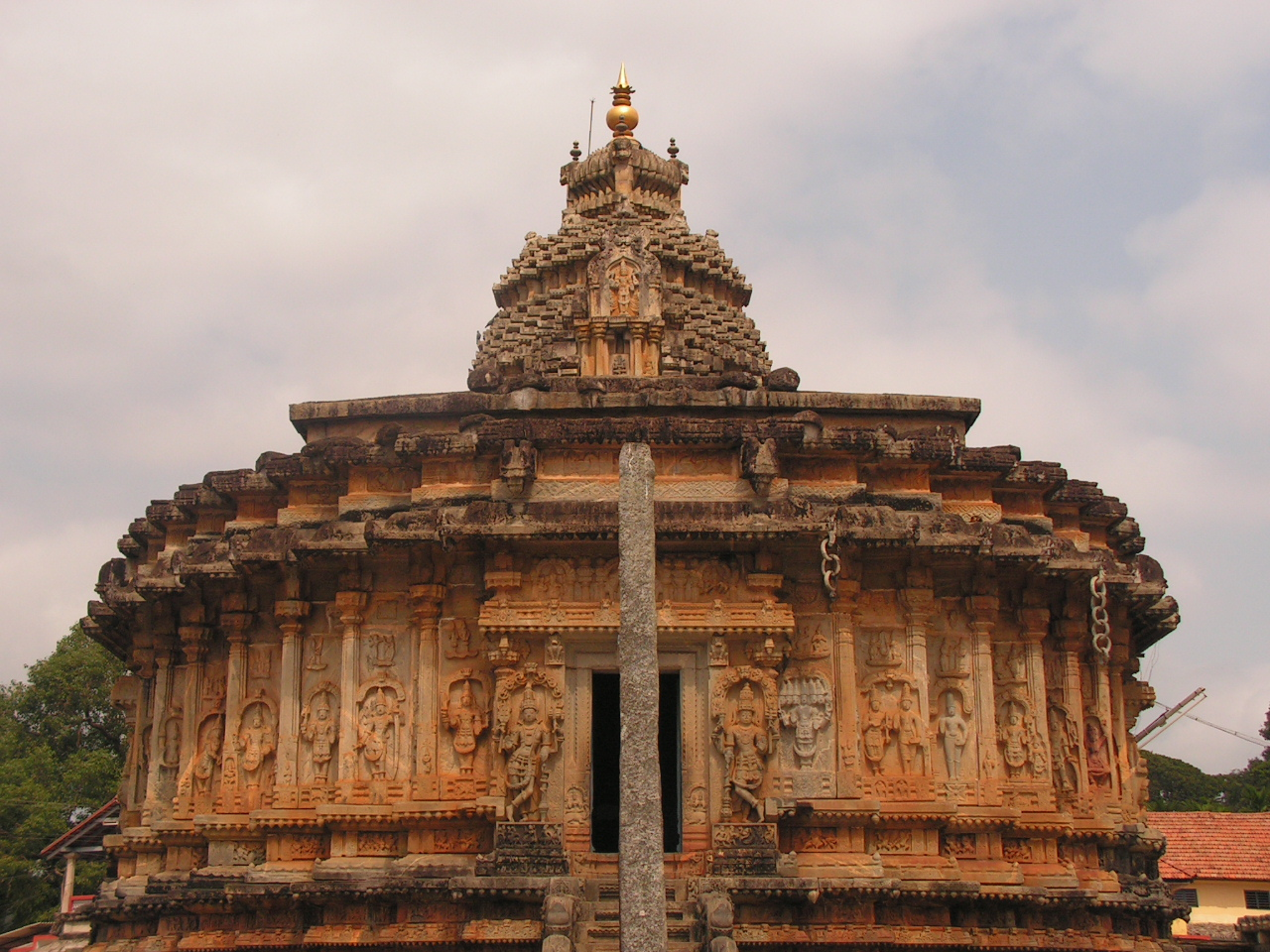
Front view of Vidyashankara Temple

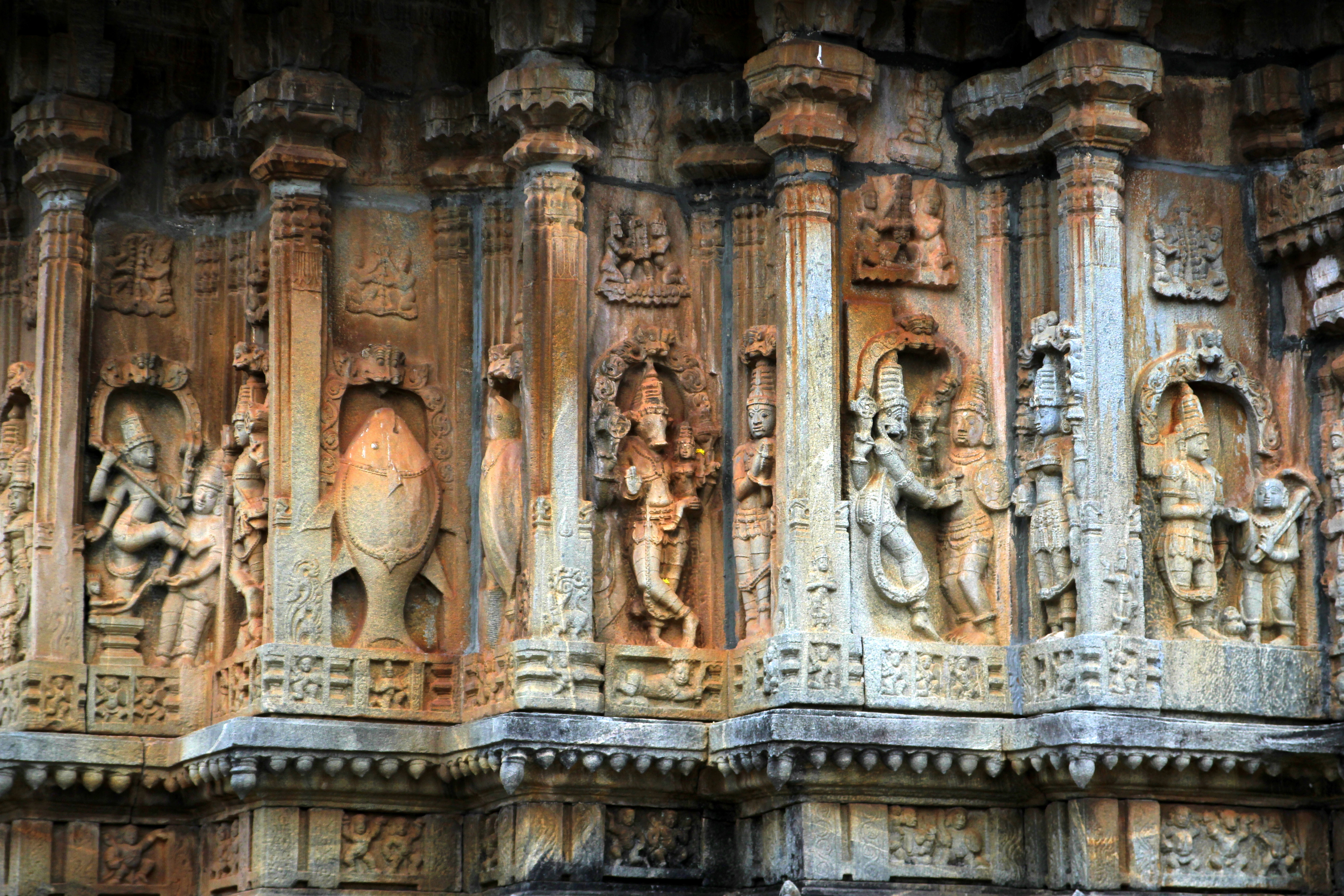
Vishnu's Dashavatara sculpted on the Vidyashankara Temple

== See also ==
- Kalady, Kerala - the holy birthplace of Jagadguru Adi Shankaracharya
- Shri Kanchi Kamakoti Peetham, Kancheepuram, Tamil Nadu
- Shri Gaudapadacharya Math
- Ramachandrapura Math
- Koodli Sringeri Shankara Matam
- Vishaka Sri Sarada Peetham

== Sources ==
- Clark, Matthew (2006), The Daśanāmī-saṃnyāsīs. The Integration Of Ascetic Lineages Into An Order, BRILL
- Hacker, Paul (1995), Philology and Confrontation: Paul Hacker on Traditional and Modern Vedanta, SUNY Press, ISBN 978-0-7914-2582-4
- Hiltebeitel, Alf (2002). Hinduism. In: Joseph Kitagawa, "The Religious Traditions of Asia: Religion, History, and Culture". Routledge. ISBN 9781136875977.
- Leela Prasad (2007). Poetics of Conduct: Oral Narrative and Moral Being in a South Indian Town. Columbia University Press. ISBN 978-0-231-13920-5.
- Leela Prasad (2010). Anand Pandian; Daud Ali (eds.). Ethical Life in South Asia. Indiana University Press. ISBN 978-0-253-35528-7.
- AK Shastri (1999), History of Shringeri, 2nd Edition, Karanatak University Press, OCLC 220890841
- Kuppuswami Sastri, S. (1984), Brahmasiddhi, by Maṇḍanamiśra, with commentary by Śankhapāṇī. 2nd ed., Delhi, India: Sri Satguru Publications
- Roodurmum, Pulasth Soobah (2002), Bhāmatī and Vivaraṇa Schools of Advaita Vedānta: A Critical Approach, Delhi: Motilal Banarsidass Publishers Private Limited
- Rosen, Steven (2006), Essential Hinduism, Greenwood Publishing Group, ISBN 9780275990060
