= Bharathi Tirtha =

36th Peetadhipathi of the Śṛṅgerī Śāradā Pīṭham

His Holiness Śrī Jagadguru Śaṅkarācārya Bhāratī Tīrtha Śrī Mahāsannidhānam
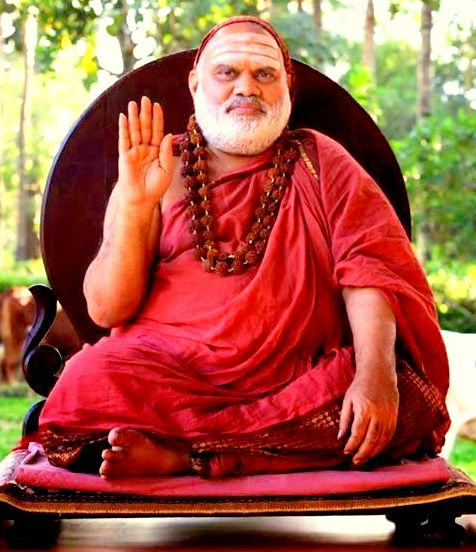
- Tīrtha in 2018
- Title: 36th Śaṅkarācārya of Śṛṅgerī Śāradā Pīṭham

Personal life
- Born: Sītārāma Āñjaneyālu; 11 April 1951 (age 75) Alugumallepadu, Dachepalli, Madras State (present-day Andhra Pradesh), India

Religious life
- Religion: Hinduism
- Order: Vedanta (Śṛṅgerī Maṭh)
- Philosophy: Advaita Vedanta
- Ordination: 11 November 1974

Religious career
- Predecessor: Abhinava Vidyatirtha
- Successor: Vidhushekhara Bharati

Jagadguru Śrī Bhāratī Tīrtha Mahāswāmiji (Sanskrit: श्रीभारतीतीर्थमहास्वामिनः), (Purvashrama name: Sītārāma Āñjaneyālu) (born 3 April 1951), is an Indian religious leader who is the current and 36th Śaṅkarācārya of Śṛṅgerī Śāradā Pīṭham, an important Hindu monastery in the tradition of Advaita Vedanta established by Ādi Śaṅkarācārya.

== Dhyāna Śloka ==
भारतीकरुणा पात्रं भारती पदभूषणम् ।
भारती पदमारूढं भारतीतीर्थमाश्रये ॥
bhāratīkaruṇā pātram bhāratī padabhūṣaṇam ।
bhāratī padamārūḍham bhāratītīrthamāśraye ॥

== Pūrvāśrama and Sannyāsa ==
Ananta Śrī Vibhūṣita Jagadguru Bhāratī Tirtha Mahaswamiji was born 03 April 1951 to a Telugu Smartha family from Narasaraopet, Andhra Pradesh.

He was a religiously minded child. His upanayana ceremony was performed when he was seven years of age. In addition to schooling, he spent his time studying Saṃskṛtam and took lessons in the Vedas from his father who himself was a Vedic scholar.

In the year 1966, at the age of 15, Āñjaneyālu approached the 35th Jagadguru of the Śṛṅgerī Śāradā Pīṭham, Jagadguru Sri Abhinava Vidyātīrtha Mahāswāmiji, seeking religious guidance from him. Jagadguru Abhinava Vidyātīrtha Mahāswāmiji accepted Brahmacāri Sītārāma Āñjaneyālu as the disciple.

Jagadguru Śrī Abhinava Vidyātīrtha Mahāswāmiji appointed Brahmacāri Sītārāma Āñjaneyalu as the successor-designate on the 11 November 1974, when Añjaneyālu received saffron robes, a staff, and a kamaṇdalu (water pot). The newly initiated sannyāsi was given the title of Yogapaṭṭa Śrī Bhāratī Tīrtha in line with the Daśanāmi Sampradāya of Jagadguru Śrī Ādi Śaṅkarācārya.

As part of the tradition, Jagadguru Bhāratī Tīrtha Mahāswāmiji undertakes tours to different places in order to offer guidance to the devotees. The most recent tour took place in 2017 and spanned Karnataka, Tamil Nadu, and Kerala.
