= Mantra pushpam =

Vedic hymn sung at Hindu rituals

Mantra pushpam is a Vedic hymn that is sung at the time of the offering of flowers to the Hindu deities at the very end of the Pujas. The mantra is considered to be the flower of Vedic chants.

This mantra is taken from the Taittiriya Aranyakam of the Yajur Veda. It speaks of the unlimited benefits which will be conferred by the secret knowledge of the water, fire, air, the sun, the moon, the stars, the clouds and time. It is normally sung in a chorus by all the Pujaris (priests) together after performing any Puja (worship) or Yajna. It tells in short that water (here water is ether) is the basis of this universe.

== Mantra and meaning ==
The mantra or the chantings consists of the following hymns

MANTRA:

यो॑-ऽपा-म्पुष्पं॒-वेँद॑ ।

पुष्प॑वा-न्प्र॒जावा᳚-न्पशु॒मा-न्भ॑वति ।

च॒न्द्रमा॒ वा अ॒पा-म्पुष्पम्᳚ ।

पुष्प॑वा-न्प्र॒जावा᳚-न्पशु॒मा-न्भ॑वति ।

य ए॒वं-वेँद॑ ।

यो॑-ऽपामा॒यत॑नं॒-वेँद॑ ।

आ॒यत॑नवा-न्भवति ॥

MEANING:

He who understands the flowers of water,

He becomes the possessor of flowers, children and animals.

Moon is the flower of the water,

He who understands this fact,

He becomes the possessor of flowers, children and animals.

He who knows the source of water,

Becomes established in himself,

MANTRA:

अ॒ग्निर्वा अ॒पामा॒यत॑नम् ।

आ॒यत॑नवा-न्भवति ।

यो᳚-ऽग्नेरा॒यत॑नं॒-वेँद॑ ।

आ॒यत॑नवा-न्भवति ।

आपो॒वा अ॒ग्नेरा॒यत॑नम् ।

आ॒यत॑नवा-न्भवति ।

य ए॒वं-वेँद॑ ।

यो॑-ऽपामा॒यत॑नं॒-वेँद॑ ।

आ॒यत॑नवा-न्भवति ॥

MEANING:

Fire is the source of water,

He who knows this,

Becomes established in himself,

Water is the source of fire,

He who knows this,

Becomes established in himself.

He who knows the source of water,

Becomes established in himself,

MANTRA:

वा॒युर्वा अ॒पामा॒यत॑नम् ।

आ॒यत॑नवा-न्भवति ।

यो वा॒योरा॒यत॑नं॒-वेँद॑ ।

आ॒यत॑नवा-न्भवति ।

आपो॒ वै वा॒योरा॒यत॑नम् ।

आ॒यत॑नवा-न्भवति ।

य ए॒वं-वेँद॑ ।

यो॑-ऽपामा॒यत॑नं॒-वेँद॑ ।

आ॒यत॑नवा-न्भवति ॥

MEANING:

Air is the source of water,

He who knows this,

Becomes established in himself,

Water is the source of air,

He who knows this,

Becomes established in himself.

He who knows the source of water,

Becomes established in himself,

MANTRA:

अ॒सौ वै तप॑न्न॒पामा॒यत॑नम् ।

आ॒यत॑नवा-न्भवति ।

यो॑-ऽमुष्य॒तप॑त आ॒यत॑नं॒-वेँद॑ ।

आ॒यत॑नवा-न्भवति ।

आपो॒ वा अ॒मुष्य॒तप॑त आ॒यत॑नम् ।

आ॒यत॑नवा-न्भवति ।

य ए॒वं-वेँद॑ ।

यो॑-ऽपामा॒यत॑नं॒-वेँद॑ ।

आ॒यत॑नवा-न्भवति ॥

MEANING:

Scorching sun is the source of water,

He who knows this,

Becomes established in himself,

Water is the source of scorching sun,

He who knows this,

Becomes established in himself.

He who knows the source of water,

Becomes established in himself,

MANTRA:

च॒न्द्रमा॒ वा अ॒पामा॒यत॑नम् ।

आ॒यत॑नवा-न्भवति ।

यश्च॒न्द्रम॑स आ॒यत॑नं॒-वेँद॑ ।

आ॒यत॑नवा-न्भवति ।

आपो॒ वै च॒न्द्रम॑स आ॒यत॑नम् ।

आ॒यत॑नवा-न्भवति ।

य ए॒वं-वेँद॑ ।

यो॑-ऽपामा॒यत॑नं॒-वेँद॑ ।

आ॒यत॑नवा-न्भवति ॥

MEANING:

Moon is the source of water,

He who knows this,

Becomes established in himself,

Water is the source of moon,

He who knows this,

Becomes established in himself.

He who knows the source of water,

Becomes established in himself,

MANTRA:

नक्षत्र॑त्राणि॒ वा अ॒पामा॒यत॑नम् ।

आ॒यत॑नवा-न्भवति ।

यो नक्षत्र॑त्राणामा॒यत॑नं॒-वेँद॑ ।

आ॒यत॑नवा-न्भवति ।

आपो॒ वै नक्ष॑त्राणामा॒यत॑नम् ।

आ॒यत॑नवा-न्भवति ।

य ए॒वं-वेँद॑ ।

यो॑-ऽपामा॒यत॑नं॒-वेँद॑ ।

आ॒यत॑नवा-न्भवति ॥

MEANING

Stars are the source of water,

He who knows this,

Becomes established in himself,

Water is the source of stars,

He who knows this,

Becomes established in himself.

He who knows the source of water,

Becomes established in himself,

MANTRA

प॒र्जन्यो॒ वा अ॒पामा॒यत॑नम् ।

आ॒यत॑नवा-न्भवति ।

यः प॒र्जन्य॑स्या॒यत॑नं॒-वेँद॑ ।

आ॒यत॑नवा-न्भवति ।

आपो॒ वै प॒र्जन्य॑स्या॒यत॑नम् ।

आ॒यत॑नवा-न्भवति ।

य ए॒वं-वेँद॑ ।

यो॑-ऽपामा॒यत॑नं॒-वेँद॑ ।

आ॒यत॑नवा-न्भवति ॥

MEANING:

Clouds are the source of water,

He who knows this,

Becomes established in himself,

Water is the source of clouds,

He who knows this,

Becomes established in himself.

He who knows the source of water,

Becomes established in himself,

MANTRA:

सं॒वँ॒त्स॒रो वा अ॒पामा॒यत॑न॒म् ।

आ॒यत॑नवा-न्भवति ।

य-स्सं॑वँत्स॒रस्या॒यत॑नं॒-वेँद॑ ।

आ॒यत॑नवा-न्भवति ।

आपो॒ वै सं॑वँत्स॒रस्या॒यत॑नम् ।

आ॒यत॑नवा-न्भवति ।

य एवं-वेँद॑ ।

यो᳚-ऽफ्सु नाव॒-म्प्रति॑ष्ठितां॒-वेँद॑ ।

प्रत्ये॒व ति॑ष्ठति ॥

MEANING:

Rainy season is the source of water,

He who knows this,

Becomes established in himself,

Water is the source of rainy season,

He who knows this,

Becomes established in himself.

He who knows that there is a raft is available,

Becomes established in that raft.

ॐ रा॒जा॒धि॒रा॒जाय॑ प्रसह्य सा॒हिने᳚ ।

नमो॑ व॒यं-वैँ᳚श्रव॒णाय॑ कुर्महे ।

स मे॒ कामा॒न् काम॒ कामा॑य॒ मह्यम्᳚ ।

का॒मे॒श्व॒रो वै᳚श्रव॒णो द॑दातु ।

कु॒बे॒राय॑ वैश्रव॒णाय॑ ।

म॒हा॒राजाय॒ नमः॑ ॥

MEANING:

Salutations to the King of kings, who is powerful and mighty.

We offer our salutations to Vaiśravaṇa (Kubera).

May He (Vaiśravaṇa) fulfill my desires for desirable objects for me.

May Vaiśravaṇa, the lord of desires, grant (them).

To Kubera, to Vaiśravaṇa.

Salutations to the great king.
