= Erasmus Primary School =

School in Hawthorn, Victoria, Australia

- Hawthorn, Victoria; Australia

Information
- Type: private
- Motto: Luceat Lux Vestra (Let your light shine)
- Religious affiliation: School of Economic Science
- Established: 1996; 30 years ago
- Founder: Leon MacLaren
- Grades: P-6
- Enrollment: 114
- Website: erasmus.vic.edu.au

Erasmus Primary School is a private school in Hawthorn, Victoria, a suburb of Melbourne, Australia, serving children from prep through year 6. It was founded by the Education Renaissance Trust, which is connected with the School of Economic Science, also known as the School of Philosophy.

== Pedagogy ==
Erasmus has a unique curriculum for an Australian primary school. The school incorporates meditation and mindfulness practices on a daily basis from early grade levels; in addition, the curriculum includes Latin and Sanskrit, the latter of which former headmaster Jonathan Tickner described as 'almost scientifically perfect'. The school also teaches once-a-week classes in philosophy and scripture, drawing from a mix of Eastern and Western philosophy, particularly relating to the Advaita Vedanta school. The school's website features quotes by Shantanand Saraswati, former head of the Jyotir Math Hindu monastery and pioneer of the Advaita movement. The unusual curriculum and pedagogy of Erasmus Primary School has received mention in the national media.

== Connection with the School of Economic Science ==
Erasmus Primary School names Leon MacLaren of the School of Economic Science as its founder. Schools associated with the School of Economic Science have been the subject of child abuse scandals and cult accusations. Erasmus was discussed extensively in internet forums for former students of the London-based St James Independent Schools, another SES-related educational institution, regarding child abuse experienced by the former students and their families; this forum was later the topic of a private inquiry finding that children were "criminally assaulted" during their time at the St James and Vedast schools.
