= School of Philosophy =

School of Philosophy may also refer to:

- The discipline of Philosophy
- School of Economic Science and Philosophy by Leon MacLaren
- School (discipline), a group of people with shared styles, approaches or aims, e.g. a school of painting, or a school of thought
- Scholasticism, a method of learning taught by the academics of medieval universities circa 1100–1500
