= Art in Action at Waterperry =

Annual art and craft festival at Waterperry House, Oxfordshire, England

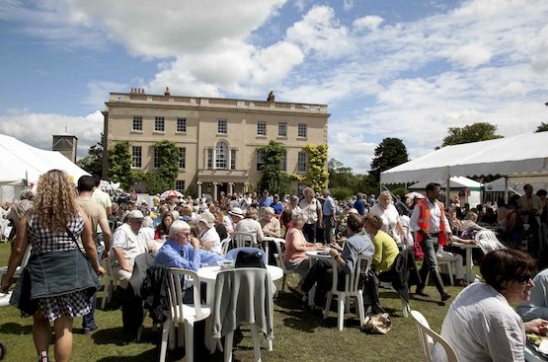
Art in Action at Waterperry House

Art in Action was an art and craft festival held in the grounds of Waterperry House in Oxfordshire. For 4 days each July artists and craftsmen set up their studios in marquees so that visitors can watch them at work. Visitors could interact with the artists, view their exhibited work, as well as buy and commission art. Art in Action ended after 40 years in 2016 due to key staff members retiring and difficulties in finding replacements for them. Handmade in Britain is hoping to take over this exhibition from 2021.

The first Art in Action took place in 1977 with around 50 artists and 14,000 visitors. Since then it has grown to some 400 artists and performers and 25,000 visitors. It was an annual pilgrimage for many people interested in the visual arts.

Art in Action was organised by the School of Economic Science, a registered charity which owns Waterperry House. Most of the 600 staff at the event were volunteers from the School. However in recent years an increasing number of volunteers have come from elsewhere.

Art in Action provided a creative environment in which artists and craft workers could demonstrate their skills and engage with the public. Each marquee hosted artists of a similar discipline such as painting, sculpture, printmaking, calligraphy, illustration, textiles, woodwork, metalwork, jewellery, ceramics and glass. Some artists and performers came from countries around the world. In a large "Market" marquee, over 100 designer makers sold their produce. These included leatherwork, toys, ceramics, glass, jewellery, hats, body care and textiles.

Art in Action offered a range of practical classes available for both children and adults. Examples included pottery, jewellery making, wood carving, glass engraving and watercolour. Some classes for adults were run by UK art colleges and institutions. These have included City and Guilds, the Prince's School of Traditional Arts, the Guild of Glass Engravers, the Art Academy of South East London and West Dean College.

Live performances included music recitals, performing arts, lectures and storytelling for children. Visitors could also visit Waterperry Gardens and take a guided tour of the frescoes inside Waterperry House.

The event was organised by Jeremy Sinclair from 2005–2014.
