= Mary Spiller =

English horticulturist and teacher (1924–2019)

Mary Rose Spiller
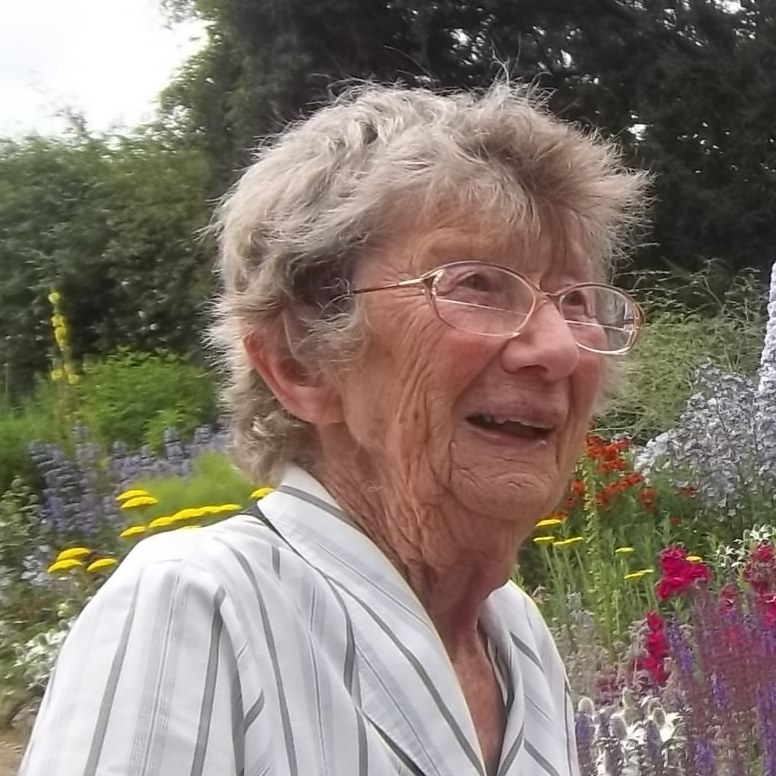
- Mary Spiller at Waterperry Gardens (2013)
- Born: 13 April 1924; Cowley, Oxfordshire, England
- Died: 27 October 2019 (aged 95)
- Occupations: horticulturalist, teacher

Mary Rose Spiller (13 April 1924 – 27 October 2019) was an English horticulturist and teacher who devoted her life to the dissemination of successful horticulture, particularly by women, in Britain. She wrote two gardening books: Growing Fruit (1980), and Weeds, Search and Destroy (1985).

== Biography ==
Spiller's parents were Olive and Reginald Spiller, a crystallographer at Oxford University. She was born and grew up in the house in Cowley where she lived throughout her life.

In 1942, she began studying at the Waterperry School of Horticulture under Beatrix Havergal. She was employed at Waterperry gardens near Wheatley, Oxfordshire. as a gardener, planner, manager and teacher from 1963 until her retirement at the age of 90 in 2013. She was horticultural manager at Waterperry from 1975 until 1990.

In the early 1980s, she was the first woman presenter of Gardeners' World, the BBC TV series about gardening. She took part in episode 6 of the 2014 BBC TV series Glorious Gardens from Above.

When Havergal retired in 1971, Spiller continued the horticultural tradition she had established until her official retirement in 2013. Her influence at Waterperry continued throughout her retirement in her work with the Friends of Waterperry Gardens, and as horticultural consultant to Waterperry Gardens.

One of Spiller's horticultural passions was alpines, but she was known as a rounded horticulturist. Alongside her work at Waterperry, Spiller gave lectures to the gardening enthusiasts around Oxfordshire for more than 60 years from the 1950s onwards.

Spiller died in October 2019 at the age of 95.

== Awards and honours ==
She was awarded the RHA Associateship of Honour in July 2008.

== Bibliography ==
- Growing Fruit (1980)
- Weeds, Search and Destroy (1985)
