= Sarum Chase =

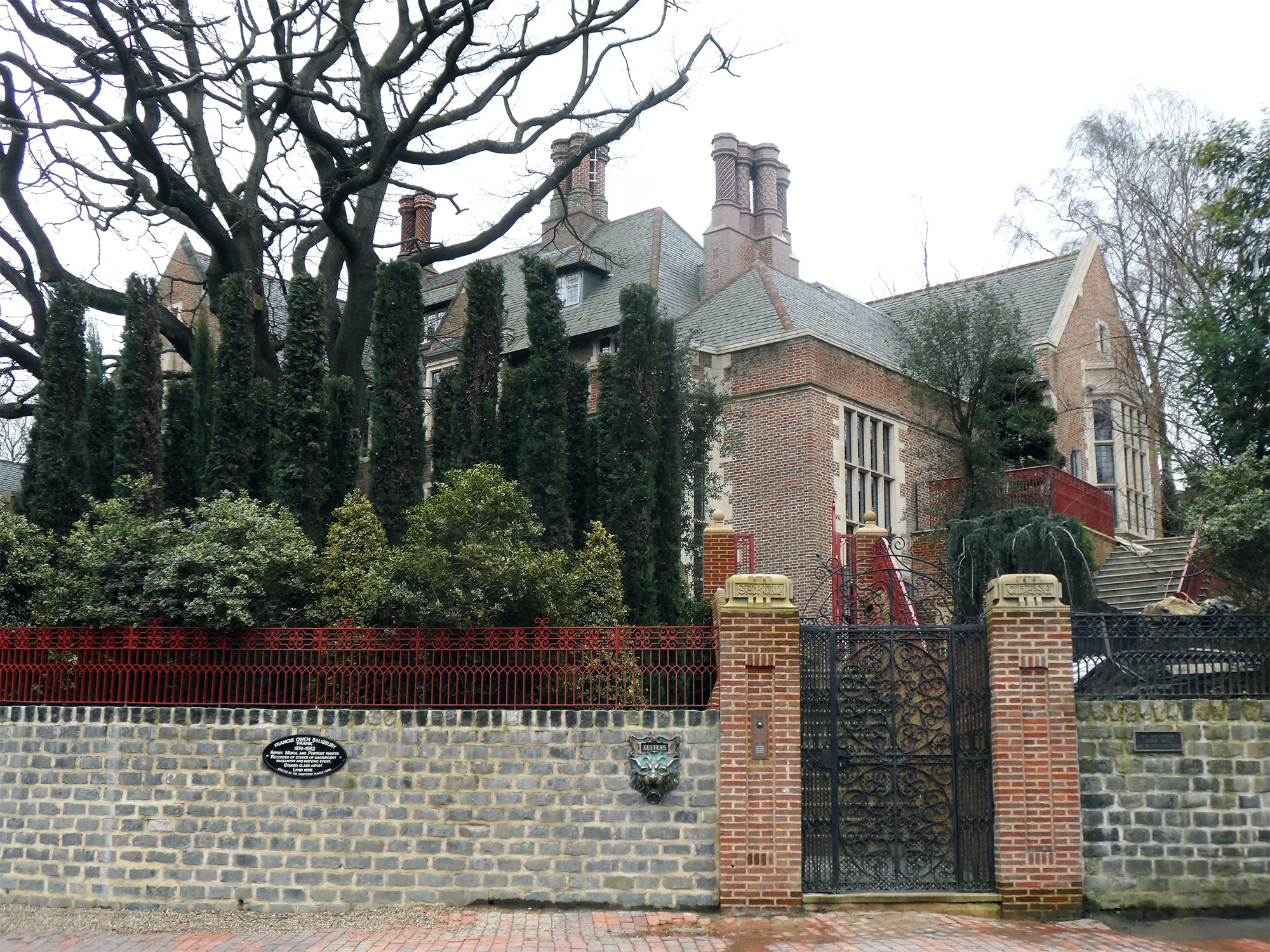
- Interactive map of the Sarum Chase area

General information
- Status: Grade II listed
- Type: Mansion
- Architectural style: Neo-Tudor
- Location: 23 West Heath Road, Hampstead, London, England
- Coordinates: 51.5623°N 0.1896°W
- Groundbreaking: 4 September 1932
- Completed: 1932
- Client: Frank O. Salisbury

Design and construction
- Architect: Vyvyan Salisbury

Sarum Chase is a large detached neo-Tudor mansion, at 23 West Heath Road, Hampstead, London, described by Nicholas Pevsner as "pure Hollywood Tudor".

The house is listed Grade II on the National Heritage List for England. The gates, railings and wall to the grounds of the house are also individually Grade II listed.

It was built in 1932 as the home and studio of portrait artist Frank O. Salisbury. The word Sarum is the old name for the town of Salisbury. The architect was Vyvyan Salisbury, his nephew. The artist's wife cut the first sod on the site, on 4 September 1932. They moved in on 4 July 1933.

In his 1953 autobiography, also titled Sarum Chase., Salisbury wrote:

Telegraph Hill rises from the junction of Platt’s Lane and West Heath Road to one of the highest points in Hampstead overlooking London, with a wonderful view across country to the Chilterns. It was the place where the beacon was lit to carry the tidings of the Spanish Armada. What a place for a garden! What a situation for a House! The land was as bare as the heath itself except for a group of giant oaks in front, and it was the glory of these trees which ultimately decided the matter. This was the last primeval site on Hampstead Heath, the very summit of London, and I resolved to have a house worthy of the situation […] This wonderful little hill at the very top of London was a wilderness of stinging nettles and wild plants and it was thrilling to look forward to what might be made of it.

On his death in August 1962, Salisbury bequeathed the house in trust to the British Council of Churches. However, the BCC sold the mansion and auctioned its contents.

On 7 June 1968, it was the setting of a photoshoot for The Rolling Stones, for their Beggars Banquet album, by photographer Michael Joseph. Previously unseen images from the shoot were exhibited at the Blink Gallery in London in November and December 2008.

The house was also the setting for a low-budget horror-glamour 8mm short film, Miss Frankenstein. It was also used for some of Andy Milligan’s London-based movies such as The Body Beneath and The Rats Are Coming! The Werewolves Are Here!. It also appeared briefly in Disney's live-action movies 101 Dalmatians and 102 Dalmatians as the exterior of Cruella De Vil’s home.

When listed, in May 1974, the house was in use as St Vedast's School for Boys, an arm of the School of Economic Science. The SES sold the building in January 2005, for £9,300,000. It is now the private residence of property developer Laurence Kirschel.
