= New Labour, New Danger =

UK political advertising campaign

Poster

New Labour, New Danger was an advertising campaign run in the United Kingdom by the Conservative Party during the run up to the 1997 general election. It was conceived by creative director Martin Casson at advertising agency M&C Saatchi, and refers to the Labour Party's "New Labour" slogan.

== Design ==
The main poster used in the campaign involved a picture of Labour Party leader Tony Blair on a black background with a strip of the poster appearing to be torn off across the eyes of Blair. The eyes were replaced with a pair of "demon eyes" with the slogan "New Labour New Danger" positioned below the picture.

A later poster used the "demon eyes" on a purse and accompanied it with the slogan "New Labour, New Taxes". The Conservatives used it as part of their party political broadcast for the election.

== Response ==
The advert was praised by Campaign, who judged it had completed its objective of questioning Blair's character. The advertisement was claimed to have gained the Conservatives £5 million worth of free publicity. Despite being declared 'the best advert of the year' it was counterproductive, and a poll by the poster site company Maiden Outdoor found 64 per cent disliked the campaign.

The advert was condemned by the Labour Party as negative advertising. In September 1996, former Conservative prime minister Edward Heath also criticized the advert. The Conservatives went on to experience their worst election defeat for more than half a century, with some journalists speculating that the poster contrasted unfavourably with Labour's more positive campaign.

The Advertising Standards Authority received 150 complaints about the Blair advert, including one from the Bishop of Oxford. The ASA upheld the complaints and instructed the Conservatives to withdraw the poster, stating they believed it portrayed Blair as "dishonest and sinister" and also because the campaign did not have Blair's permission to use his image. In 1999, the ASA decided to stop regulating political advertising, citing this advert as a particularly difficult case and saying: "The free flow of argument in the cut and thrust of open debate is the best antidote to political advertising that misleads or offends."

== Legacy ==
In August 2012, it was announced that the "demon eyes" design would be used in the American film The Campaign.

The Labour Party's workers founded an amateur football team called Demon Eyes F.C. named after the adverts. The football team once won Thames League Division 1, before being disbanded.

== See also ==
- Dark Brandon
