= Clara Salaman =

English actress and writer (born 1967)

- Born: 19 May 1967 (age 59); Islington, London, England
- Other name: Natalie Daniels
- Occupations: Actor, writer
- Spouse: James Sanders (m. 1989; div. 1991)
- Partner: Paul Brennan
- Children: 2
- Relatives: Dora Tulloch (great grandmother)

Clara Rachel Salaman (born 19 May 1967) is an English actress and writer.

She played the role of undercover CIB DS Claire Stanton in the long running ITV drama The Bill from 1999 to 2001. She first appeared in The Bill as a victim, Penny Thompson, in episode 6 of series 11 in 1995. She has also appeared in other television programmes, including A Touch of Frost, Kingdom and Heartbeat.

Her first novel was Shame on You, and in a related piece recalled her own family upbringing as part of an unnamed religious cult in The Guardian in July 2009. The school has been named as one of the St James Independent Schools, following the precepts of the School of Philosophy and Economic Science. Her second novel, The Boat, appeared in 2014, based on her real experience aged 18 when Salaman and her fiancé hitched a ride on a yacht with couple who claimed to sexually abuse their young daughter. While criticisms were made of Salaman's failure to report the suspected abuse, Salaman provided her reasoning to The Guardian. She has adapted her third novel, Too Close (published pseudonymously as Natalie Daniels), into a three-part television series of the same name.

== Filmography ==
=== Television ===
| Year | Title | Role | Notes |
|---|---|---|---|
| 1990 | The Ruth Rendell Mysteries | Nurse Rose | 2 episodes |
| 1992 | The Old Devils | Young Rhiannon | 2 episodes |
| 1992 | A Fatal Inversion | Mary Gage | 2 episodes |
| 1993 | Maigret | Betty | Episode: "Maigret and the Night Club Dancer" |
| 1993 | All in the Game | Claire Travis | 6 episodes |
| 1994 | A Touch of Frost | Kathy Reynolds | Episode: "Widows and Orphans" |
| 1995 | Heartbeat | Jill Criddle | Episode: "It's All in the Game" |
| 1995–2001 | The Bill | Claire Stanton | 34 episodes |
| 1996 | Bugs | Dr. Kim | Episode: "Newton's Run" |
| 2001 | Beech is Back | Claire Stanton | 6 episodes |
| 2001–2009 | Holby City | Various | 5 episodes |
| 2003 | In Deep | Jenny Hunter | 2 episodes |
| 2005 | William and Mary | Rosie | Episode: #3.3 |
| 2005 | Bad Girls | Pathologist | Episode: #7.11 |
| 2007 | Secret Life | Chloe's Mother | Television film |
| 2007 | Kingdom | Angela Forshaw | Episode: #1.4 |
| 2007 | EastEnders | Delia | 3 episodes |
| 2007 | Doctors | Sheryl Donahue | 2 episodes |
| 2009 | Doc Martin | Aunt Jennie | Episode: "Uneasy Lies the Head" |
| 2011 | M.I. High | Dr. Carla Baxter | Episode: "Day of the Jacket" |
| 2011 | Silk | Alexis Glover | Episode: "All Plain Sailing" |
| 2026 | Forever Home | Sienna | Episode: #1.1 |
