= Waterperry =

Village in Oxfordshire, England

Coordinates: 51.755°N 1.094°W

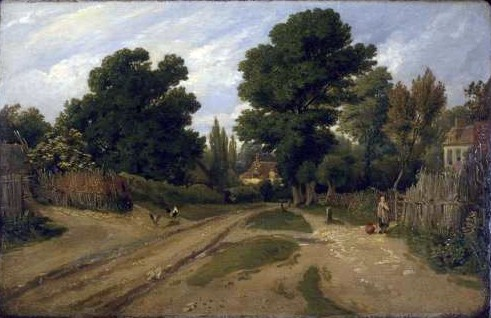
- Waterperry, Oxfordshire (1803) by William Alfred Delamotte

- Location within Oxfordshire
- Population: 198 (Waterperry with Thomley parish, 2021)
- OS grid reference: SP626066
- Civil parish: Waterperry with Thomley
- District: South Oxfordshire
- Shire county: Oxfordshire
- Region: South East
- Country: England
- Sovereign state: United Kingdom
- Post town: Oxford
- Postcode district: OX33
- Dialling code: 01865
- Police: Thames Valley
- Fire: Oxfordshire
- Ambulance: South Central
- UK Parliament: Henley
- Website: Waterperry

Waterperry is a village in the civil parish of Waterperry with Thomley, in the South Oxfordshire district of Oxfordshire, England. It lies about 7 miles (11 km) east of Oxford and is in the valley of the River Thame, close to the county boundary with Buckinghamshire.

The Church of England parish church of Saint Mary the Virgin is partly Saxon and has notable medieval stained glass, sculptural memorials, Georgian box pews and memorial brasses.

Waterperry House is a 17th-century mansion, remodelled early in the 18th century for Sir John Curson and again around 1820. It is now a house of seven bays and three storeys with a balustraded parapet and Ionic porch.

The house has extensive grounds, and until 1971 housed the Waterperry School of Horticulture under Beatrix Havergal. Since 1971 the house has been owned and used as a country retreat by the School of Economic Science. The gardens are now a horticultural business and visitor destination, Waterperry Gardens. The 8 acres (3 ha) of gardens include rose and alpine gardens, a formal knot garden, trained fruit and nursery beds and a riverside walk. The grounds also have nurseries, orchards, plant centre and teashop. Gardening courses are still taught here. The grounds host the annual Art in Action festival of art and craft each July.

Waterperry was an ancient parish in the Bullingdon Hundred of Oxfordshire. The parish included the hamlet of Thomley as well as Waterperry itself. Thomley appears to have been a thriving settlement in the early 13th century, but subsequently declined to the point where by the 19th century Thomley essentially just comprised the farm of Thomley Hall and its outbuildings.

Despite Thomley's decline, parish functions under the poor laws from the 17th century onwards were administered separately for the hamlet of Thomley and the rest of Waterperry parish. As such, Thomley became a separate civil parish in 1866 when the legal definition of 'parish' was changed to be the areas used for administering the poor laws.

Thomley and Waterperry parishes were merged into a single civil parish called "Waterperry and Thomley" in 1995, effectively reuniting the ancient parish of Waterperry under a new name.

== Sources and further reading ==
- Lobel, Mary D, ed. (1957). A History of the County of Oxford: Volume 5: Bullingdon Hundred. Victoria County History. pp. 295–309.
- Sherwood, Jennifer; Pevsner, Nikolaus (1974). Oxfordshire. The Buildings of England. Harmondsworth: Penguin Books. pp. 826–828. ISBN 0-14-071045-0.
- Todd, John (1969) [1955]. J.S (ed.). Waterperry Church (2nd ed.).
