= Waterperry with Thomley =

Civil parish in Oxfordshire, England

Coordinates: 51.764°N 1.082°W

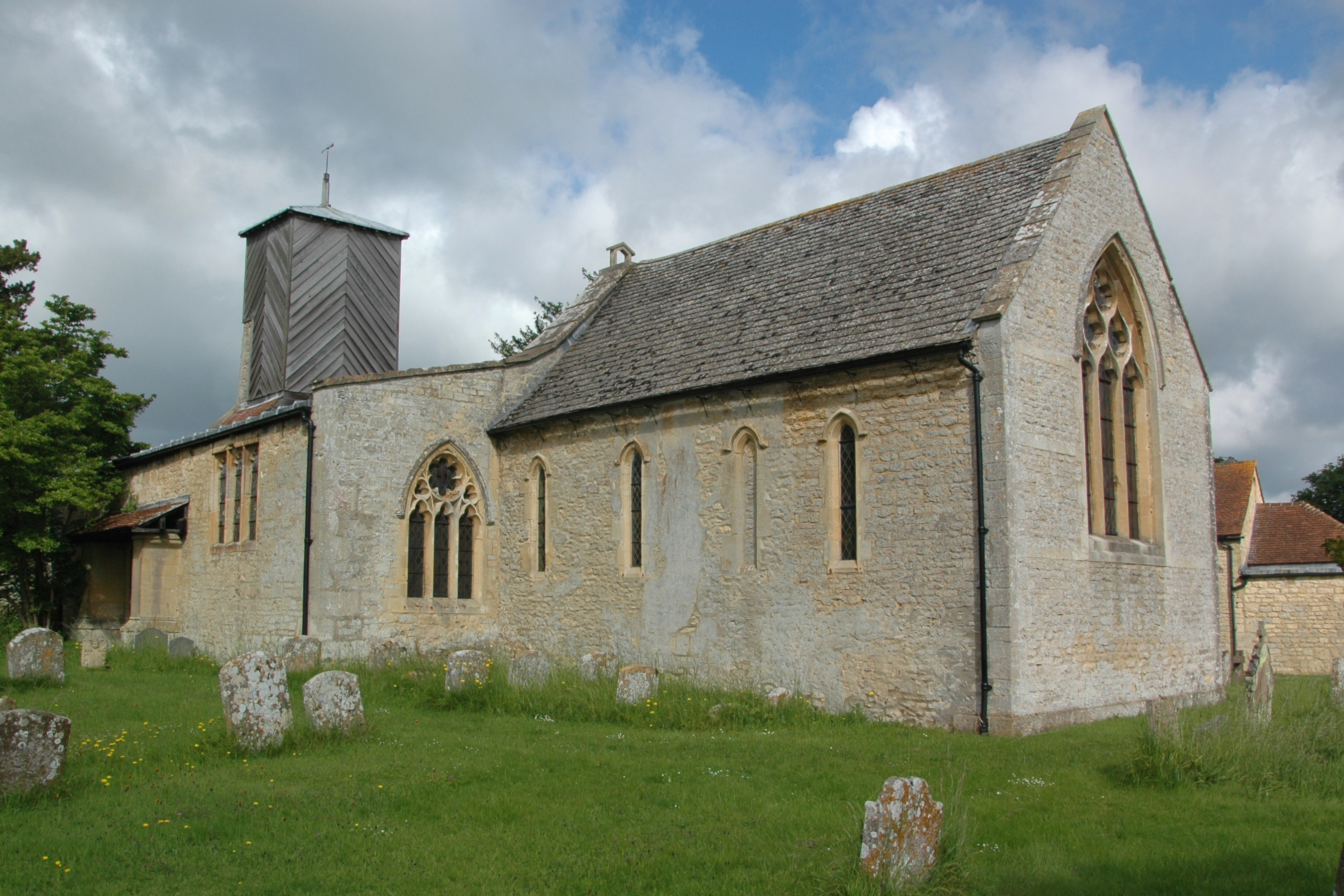
- Waterperry church

- Location within Oxfordshire
- Population: 198 (Parish, 2021)
- Civil parish: Waterperry with Thomley
- District: South Oxfordshire
- Shire county: Oxfordshire
- Region: South East
- Country: England
- Sovereign state: United Kingdom
- UK Parliament: Henley and Thame

Waterperry with Thomley is a civil parish in the South Oxfordshire district of Oxfordshire, England. It includes the village of Waterperry and surrounding rural areas, including the site of the deserted medieval village of Thomley, where there is now only a single farm. The parish is in the valley of the River Thame and centred approximately 7 miles (11 km) east of the city of Oxford. It is crossed by the M40 motorway and adjoins the county boundary with Buckinghamshire. At the 2021 census the parish had a population of 198.

== History ==
Waterperry was an ancient parish in the Bullingdon Hundred of Oxfordshire. The parish included the hamlet of Thomley as well as Waterperry itself. Thomley appears to have been a thriving settlement in the early 13th century, but subsequently declined to the point where by the 19th century Thomley essentially just comprised the farm of Thomley Hall and its outbuildings.

Despite Thomley's decline, parish functions under the poor laws from the 17th century onwards were administered separately for the hamlet of Thomley and the rest of Waterperry parish. As such, Thomley became a separate civil parish in 1866 when the legal definition of 'parish' was changed to be the areas used for administering the poor laws.

Thomley and Waterperry parishes were merged into a single civil parish called "Waterperry and Thomley" in 1995, effectively reuniting the ancient parish of Waterperry under a new name.
