= Jeremy Sinclair =

British advertising executive (born 1946)

Jeremy Theodorson Sinclair CBE (born 1946) is a British businessman and advertising executive who was a founding director in 1995 of ad agency M&C Saatchi, having earlier been one of the founders of Saatchi & Saatchi in 1970.

== Early life and education ==
Sinclair was born in Newcastle, and educated in Scotland at Rannoch School. He continued on to Watford College of Art and Technology and briefly studied at the Sorbonne in Paris.

== Career ==
Sinclair began his career in advertising in 1968 when he joined Cramer Saatchi. In 1970 he joined Saatchi & Saatchi as a founding member. He became creative director in 1973 and chairman in 1982 of Saatchi & Saatchi UK. In 1986 he became the Deputy Chairman of Saatchi & Saatchi plc. 1995 saw the creation of M&C Saatchi, founded by himself, Bill Muirhead, David Kershaw, Maurice and Charles Saatchi.

== Campaigns ==
While working at Cramer Saatchi in 1967 he was responsible for overseeing one of their most significant campaigns. The campaign was for the Health and Education Council in 1969 and was titled "The pregnant man". Once Saatchi & Saatchi had formed and Sinclair had taken on his role, he was the mind behind the 1979 "Labour Isn't Working" campaign. He regularly devises political advertising campaigns for the Conservative Party, and created the "demon eyes" caricature of Tony Blair. He is also one of two directors of the Tony Blair Faith Foundation. As part of the continued links between Saatchi & Saatchi and the Conservative party, Sinclair's political adverts have become well-known.

His campaigns for Schweppes and the launch of Cosmopolitan magazine in the UK earned him international recognition with two Gold Lions at the Cannes Advertising festival. He has additionally won three silver awards at the Designers and Art Directors Association, and golds at the British Press Awards.

== Other interests and non-executive roles ==
Sinclair teaches Philosophy twice a week at the London School of Economic Science.

He has been the chairman of a number of charities, including the School of Communication Arts, The Designers and Art Directors Association, The Art Academy and the Independent Educational Association. He was briefly chairman and a trustee of the Tony Blair Faith Foundation.

He is a governor St. James School, a senior member and lecturer in the School of Philosophy, and for ten years, was organiser of the School's annual event known as Art in Action at Waterperry. He was a founding shareholder in the Dukes Education group of companies

He is the author of the book, Brutal Simplicity of Thought. The thesis of Sinclair's book is to strip creative thought back to ensure that advertising campaigns have maximum impact in their simplicity.

Along with his wife Jacqueline, Sinclair authored the children's book Faces, Faces, Faces, published by Penguin Random House. The story explores the world of faces that children see in inanimate objects. The inspiration behind the book comes from previous artwork that his wife created, as well as her enjoyment of the children stories that Sinclair told their own children.

Sinclair was appointed Commander of the Order of the British Empire (CBE) in the 2017 New Year Honours for services to advertising.

Sinclair created and co-wrote the 1988 British television comedy series for children News at Twelve. The series followed 12-year-old Kevin Doyle (Ewan Phillips) and his nightly "news bulletins" about the events in his life (and some events from his imagination).
