= M+C Saatchi Group =

British advertising agency network

M&C Saatchi Group plc
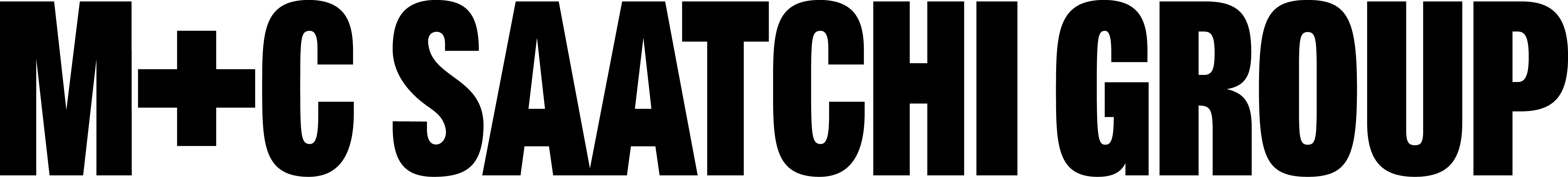
- Traded as: LSE: SAA
- Industry: Advertising
- Founded: May 1995
- Founder: Maurice Saatchi, Charles Saatchi, Jeremy Sinclair, Bill Muirhead, David Kershaw
- Headquarters: London, England
- Number of locations: 23
- Area served: Americas, Asia Pacific, Europe, Middle East and South Africa
- Key people: Heather Rabbatts (interim Global CEO)
- Revenue: £231.4 million (2024)
- Number of employees: 2003
- Website: www.mcsaatchi.com

M+C Saatchi Group (LSE: SAA) is a British communications company, formed in May 1995 as an advertising agency. With more than 2,400 staff, the group has its headquarters in London, and offices in several other countries. M+C Saatchi Group claims to be the world's largest independent communications network.

M&C Saatchi plc is listed on the Alternative Investment Market.

== History ==
M+C Saatchi Group began as an advertising agency in 1995, founded by Maurice and Charles Saatchi, Jeremy Sinclair, Bill Muirhead and David Kershaw, in a split from Saatchi & Saatchi. A number of Saatchi & Saatchi's London management and creative staff also joined. Some clients soon followed, including Gallaher Group, Mirror Newspapers, Dixons and after a competitive pitch, British Airways and its part subsidiary Qantas, as well as the Conservative Party, for whom they made the infamous New Labour, New Danger adverts. By early 1996, the network consisted of offices in London, Singapore, Hong Kong, Sydney, New York and Auckland. In 2020, the group stated that it operated in 24 countries, with regional offices in London, New York, Milan, Cape Town, Sydney and Singapore.

In 2019, some accounting errors from previous financial years were discovered. Problems included the early recognition of revenue for projects not fully completed and the capitalising of assets which ought to have been expensed. The issues were brought to the attention of the directors and an announcement was made that charges of £6.4 million would be booked in the 2019 year relating to either 2018 or 2019. PwC were appointed as independent advisors to review and confirm findings. In December 2019, the Board announced the total charges would in fact be £11.6 million. The company's original auditor KPMG resigned earlier in 2019.

It was reported that the agency's client, the Financial Conduct Authority – Britain's financial watchdog - issued a formal request for information to examine M+C Saatchi's disclosure of the accounting problems which prompted the share price fall.

In January 2021, the founders of the agency stepped down and Moray MacLennan became the new CEO. In January 2021, M+C Saatchi Group hosted a virtual capital markets event for institutional investors and analysts, where they announced a new strategy and operating model. The new mantra 'We Navigate, Create and Lead Meaningful Change' was launched, described by MacLennan as a 'new chapter' for M+C Saatchi. Following this launch and announcement of positive financial results, the M+C Saatchi plc share price rallied, jumping from 90p to 150p in early March 2021.

On 13 May 2024, Zaid Al-Qassab, former CMO of Channel 4, joined as Global CEO.

On 31 March 2026, Global CEO Zaid Al‑Qassab stepped down, with Dame Heather Rabbatts taking on the role of Executive Chair on an interim basis.

In July 2026, terms were agreed for the Australasian business to be sold in a management buyout.

== Awards ==
Agency Awards include:

- Campaign, Start-up Agency of the Year: Fluency, 2023.
- UK Sponsorship Awards, Agency of the Year: M+C Saatchi Sport & Entertainment, 2023.
- Fast Company names SS+K, part of M+C Saatchi Group The 10 most innovative companies in advertising of 2023.
- Marketing Interactive Agency of the Year Awards, Creative Agency of the Year (Gold), Independent Agency of the Year (Silver), Agency team of the year (Silver), Best Agency - client partnership (Silver) M+C Saatchi Malaysia 2023.
- The American Business Awards, Marketing or Advertising Agency of the Year M+C Saatchi Performance US 2022.
- Campaign Media, Performance Marketing Agency of the Year Bronze, 2022.
- Agency of the Year Campaign Awards, M+C Saatchi Indonesia, 2021.
- Agency of the Decade, NC Digital Awards, M+C Saatchi Milano, 2021.
- Most Innovative Company, Australian Financial Review Awards, M+C Saatchi Australia Group, 2017, 2019.
- Agency of the Decade, Mobile Marketing Effectiveness Awards, M+C Saatchi Performance (formerly known as M+C Saatchi Mobile), 2020.
- Large Agency of the Year, FM Adfocus Awards, M+C Saatchi Abel, 2019.
- Agency of the Year, BT Sport Industry Awards, M+C Saatchi Sport & Entertainment, 6 times winners.
- Leading Consultants, Financial Times, Clear M+C Saatchi, 2017–21.
- Large Consultancy of the Year, UK Sponsorship Awards, M+C Saatchi Sport & Entertainment, 2019.
- Most Effective Media Agency The Drum, M+C Saatchi Performance, 2015, 2016, 2017, 2018.
- Digital Agency of the Year, The DADI Awards, M+C Saatchi Performance, 2016.
- Consultancy of the Year, PR Week, M+C Saatchi PR, 2017.
- Agency of the Year, Campaign Asia-Pacific, M+C Saatchi Australia Group, 2015.
- Creative Talent Management Agency of the Year, Business Excellence Awards from Acquisition International Magazine, M+C Saatchi Merlin, 2014.

Work Awards include:

- Bronze Cannes Lions, The Impossible drive, Lego, 2025
- Silver PR Cannes Lion, Plastic Forecast for Minderoo Foundation 2024
- SABRE Awards EMEA, Best Reputation Work - 500 Tonnes Light: Grand Prix winner 2023.
- Lynx Awards Grand Prix, Film, Grand Prix winner, Grand Prix - Film Craft, Grand Prix winner, Film Craft – Direction, Silver, Film – Script, Silver for As good as the original campaign and Film Craft - Use of Original Music, Loyalty, Bronze and World Cup, Bronze Film - Online Film campaign, 2023.
- LA Film Festival, Best Animation Short Tourism Australia - Come & Say G'Day, 2023.
- UK Sponsorship Awards: Women's Sport Sponsorship Award, Heineken, Cheers to All Fans Winner, Brand Sponsorship, Heineken, Cheers to All Fans, Winner, Sponsorship of the Year, Heineken, Cheers to All Fans, Winner, UKSA Spotlight Award - drinks sector (no entries, picked by UKSA), Heineken, Cheers to All Fans, Winner, International Sponsorship Award, Heineken x F1 - When you Drive Never Drink 2022, Winner, Best social purpose, community or charity sponsorship, Barclays, It all starts with a chance, Winner, Sport Sponsorship, O2, Wear the rose, Winner, 2023.
- The One Show Social Media: Stunts & Activations Business Iceland Outhorse your email, Gold 2023.
- US Effies, Talk/SS+K, Travel & Tourism (Silver), Current Events (Silver) and small budget (Bronze) for Business Iceland Icelandverse campaign 2023.
- The ABBY Awards - Animation - Video Craft, U GRO Capital - FUND ISLAND (Gold), Special effects U GRO Capital FUND ISLAND (Silver), Reliance Jewels, MAHALAYA: Celebrating Grace & Glory, (Silver) and Reliance Jewels, RANNKAAR (Bronze) 2023.
- The ANDY's - Craft Idea: Business Iceland - Outhorse your email, winner SS+K 2023.
- Effies Awards, Golds in: David vs. Goliath, Travel & Tourism and Small Budgets - Services, for 'Looks Like You Need to Let It Out' for Promote Iceland, 2021.
- PR Week Awards, Winner Global Integration, Looks Like You Need To Let it Out' for Promote Iceland, 2021.
- Fast Company World Changing Idea, 'The Street Store' for Haven Shelter, 2020.
- D&AD Graphite Pencil – 'rightmyname' for Nandos, M+C Saatchi Abel, 2019.
- APG Creative Strategy Award, Long-Term Thinking, 'Change4Life' for PHE, 2019.
- Loeries Grand Prix, 'Afrotising' for Nando's.
- Cannes Lions Titanium Lion Wood Pencil, 'Clever Buoy' for Optus, 2015.
- IPA Effectiveness Award, 'Be Clear on Cancer' for PHE, 2014.
- BAFTA, Best Comedy and Entertainment Show, for A League of their Own, 2014.
- IPA Effectiveness Award, London 2012 Olympics Campaign, 2012.
