= Waterperry Gardens =

Gardens in Oxfordshire, England

Coordinates: 51.7526°N 1.0888°W

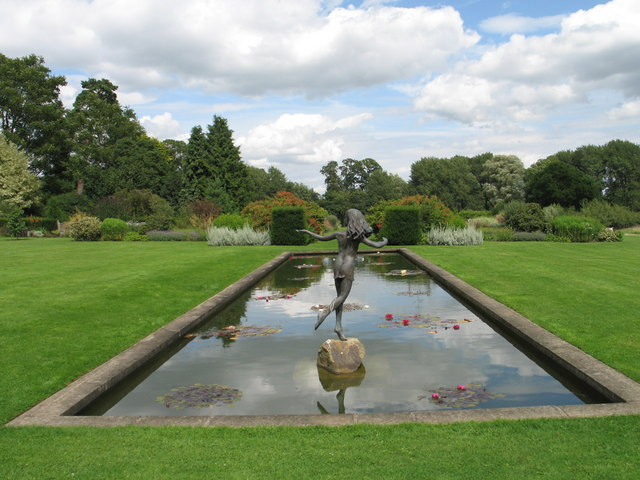
Waterperry Gardens

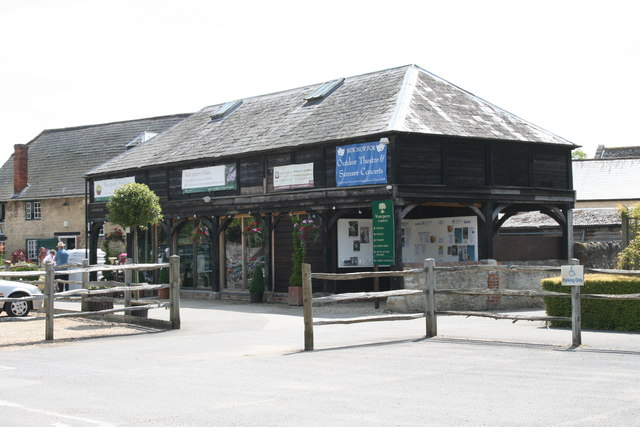
Museum at Waterperry Gardens

Waterperry Gardens are gardens with a museum in the village of Waterperry, near Wheatley in Oxfordshire, England.

== History ==
Beatrix Havergal (1901–1980) established in 1932 the Waterperry School of Horticulture, a school of horticulture for ladies, that continued until her retirement in 1971. The Waterperry estate provided Royal Sovereign strawberries to Buckingham Palace and the Chelsea Flower Show.

In 1972, the School of Economic Science purchased the Waterperry Estate, including Waterperry Gardens, which it continues to run to generate revenue for the school.

== Gardens ==
There are eight acres of landscaped ornamental gardens with an alpine garden, formal knot garden, herbaceous borders, riverside walk, rose garden, and water-lily canal. There are also five acres of orchards, and two collections of saxifrages which are accredited with Plant Heritage under the National Plant Collection scheme. The gardens are considered notable for the broad variety of snowdrops that grow in the spring.

The Museum of Rural Life is housed in an 18th-century granary building, with displays of implements and tools. Other facilities include a gallery, garden shop, gift shop, museum, plant centre, and tea shop.

== In popular culture ==
Since 2017, the Waterperry Opera Festival has taken place in the grounds and the house.

In 2023, the BBC programme Make it at Market used Waterperry Gardens as the backdrop to the second series.

== Notable alumnae ==
- Mary Spiller, teacher at the school, presenter of Gardeners' Question Time
- Pamela Schwerdt, joint head gardener at Sissinghurst Castle Garden
- Valerie Finnis, specialist in alpine plants

== See also ==
- List of museums in Oxfordshire
- Museum of Oxford
