= School of Philosophy and Economic Science =

Worldwide organisation based in London

Coordinates: 51.5168°N 0.1514°W

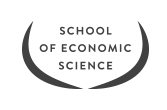

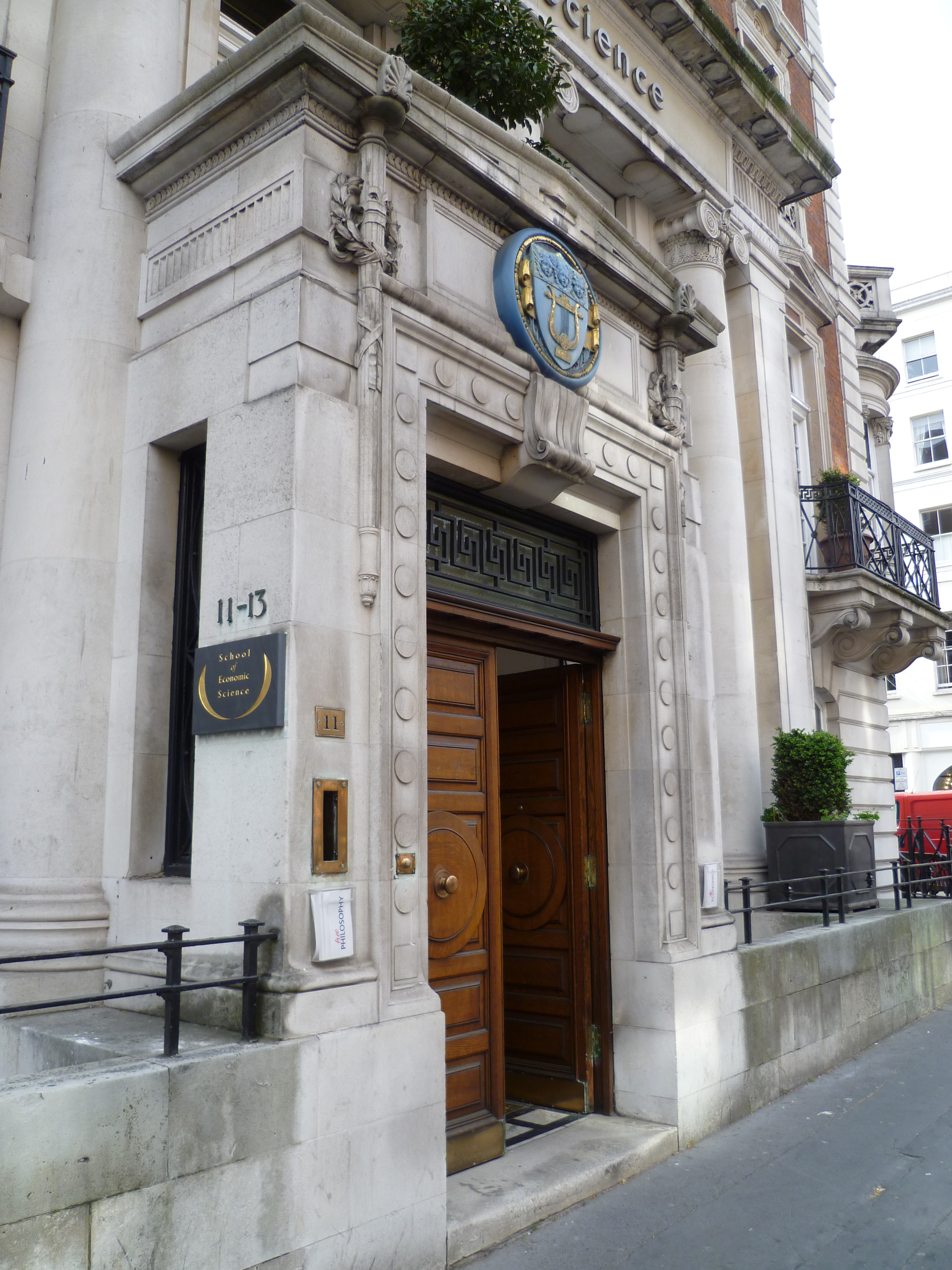
- The School of Philosophy and Economic Science entrance, Mandeville Place, London

Location
- 11-13 Mandeville Place; Marylebone; London; United Kingdom

Information
- Other names: School of Philosophy, School of Practical Philosophy, School voor Filosofie, Escuela de Filosofia Practica, The Foundation for Philosophic Studies
- Former names: Henry George School of Economics, School of Economic Science
- Established: 1938
- Founder: Leon MacLaren
- Trust: Fellowship of the School of Economic Science
- Classes offered: Practical Philosophy, Economics with Justice, Sanskrit Language
- Leader: Donald Lambie
- Principal: Stephen Silver
- Registered charity numbers: 313115 & SC039950
- Global locations: Argentina, Australia, Belgium, Canada, Cyprus, Fiji, Germany, Greece, Holland, Hungary, Ireland, Israel, Malta, New Zealand, Spain, South Africa, Trinidad, UK, USA, Venezuela
- Website: https://schoolofphilosophy.org/

The School of Philosophy and Economic Science (SPES), also operating under the names the School of Philosophy and the School of Practical Philosophy and legally named the School of Economic Science (SES), is a worldwide organisation based in London. It offers non-academic courses for adults, primarily influenced by Advaita Vedanta, an orthodox philosophical system of Hinduism. The SES has a history of criminal child abuse that started in the 1970s and lasted at least two decades in its two associated schools, St James Independent Schools and St Vedast's. The organisation advocates conservative values with traditional gender roles and sexual ethics. It has been described as a cult, sect, or new religious movement, including by several former members.

The organisation advertises introductory courses entitled "Practical Philosophy", "Economics with Justice", and other courses including Sanskrit language. The Practical Philosophy course involves a meditative process known as "The Awareness Exercise" and discussion of universal themes drawing on the work of European and Indian philosophers such as Plato, Marsilio Ficino, Swami Vivekananda and Adi Shankara, as well as Advaita. After five years of involvement, people mainly study Advaita and are required to take up meditation, to undertake voluntary work to help with the running of the organisation and to attend residential programmes.

While initially based in London, as of 2012, the SES had a total of around 20,000 enrolments in up to 80 branches worldwide, across 18 countries, including 3,173 enrolments in the UK.

SES is registered as a charity in the UK.

== History ==
=== Foundation ===
The School of Economic Science was founded in the UK in 1938 by Andrew MacLaren MP under the name Henry George School of Economics. Initially an economics study group that explored the economic theories of the American economist Henry George, the group met in a Parliamentary committee room of the Houses of Parliament. Leon MacLaren then inherited the organisation from his father, Andrew, and changed its focus to "the study of natural laws governing the relations between men in society". He considered science to be a study of laws that already exist in nature, and economics the study of human nature and its interaction with the natural universe. In 1942 the name of the group was changed to the School of Economic Science, the name used until 2019, when the name was changed to School of Philosophy and Economic Science.

==== Influence of Ouspensky and Gurdjieff ====
MacLaren studied the book The Realm of Art (1946), a wide-ranging survey of ideas about the nature of humanity, society, art, science, religion, evolution, creativity, free will, mind and matter, knowledge and consciousness. It was this book which first introduced him to the ideas of P. D. Ouspensky; he incorporated its ideas to the SES and invited the author, Peter Goffin, to give lectures.

Ouspensky was a pupil of G. I. Gurdjieff. Gurdjieff's philosophy, called the "Fourth Way", was also incorporated into SES teaching. In 1953, MacLaren met Francis C. Roles, a pupil of Ouspensky who had established the Study Society in 1951 to continue the teaching of the Fourth Way. When MacLaren died in the mid-1990s, the SES gradually underwent a change in approach, choosing to be more open. Nowadays, SES has phased out most of its Gurdjieffian material, although it acknowledges Gurdjieff and Ouspensky as a source of the first Philosophy courses on its official SES website.

==== Influence of Maharishi Mahesh Yogi ====
Ouspensky believed that Gurdjieff's teachings were incomplete and both Roles and MacLaren were eager to discover the missing elements. In 1959, MacLaren discovered the teachings of Advaita Vedanta after meeting the Maharishi Mahesh Yogi, and began to practice Transcendental Meditation (TM). Both Roles and MacLaren became pupils of Maharishi Mahesh Yogi. On 13 March 1961, MacLaren organised a meeting, called the "1961 World Congress", for the Maharishi at the Royal Albert Hall. Two days prior to the event smaller meetings were held at Caxton Hall. The Royal Albert Hall meeting was attended by 5,000 people, nearly all SES members.

The particular type of meditation used by SES was developed by Brahmananda Saraswati. MacLaren was taken through its initiation ritual, and speculated that he had found the source of Gurdjieff's ideas.

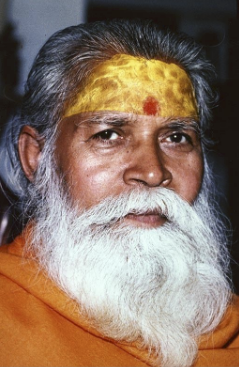
Sri Shantanada Saraswathi

==== Advaita and Sanskrit ====
On a trip to India to study meditation with the Maharishi Mahesh Yogi, Roles met the Shankarcharya of Jyotir Math, Swami Shantanand Saraswati, who Roles believed was the spiritual advisor both the Study society and SES were seeking. He introduced MacLaren to Shantandand and they both became his students. Swami Shantananda Saraswati had been a disciple, with the Maharishi, of the previous Shankaracharya of Jyotir Math, Swami Brahmananda Saraswati. From this point on, MacLaren and the SES's teachings became predominately based on Advaita Vedanta. During the mid-1950s, Practical Philosophy became the central subject of teaching and practice at SES and remains so today. MacLaren's discussions with Shantanand Saraswati solidified the central principle of SES's philosophy as "unity in diversity", a merger of Eastern philosophy and Western wisdom.

Teaching is disseminated by SES advanced students who are volunteer teachers, and is maintained by the successors of MacLaren and Shantanand Saraswati, these being Donald Lambie and SES guru Sri Vasudevananda Saraswati respectively.

From 1965 until MacLaren's death in 1994, conversations between MacLaren and Shantananda Saraswat were recorded and transcribed every 2 years. These were published in a four volume series. In his conversations with MacLaren, Shantananda Saraswati stated the importance of Sanskrit language in the study of Advaita. The study of Sanskrit language at SES began in the late 1960s and became a formal part of what was called the "middle school" in 1977. SES is considered a world-class centre for the study of Sanskrit.

Saraswati also taught that regular and disciplined meditation was highly important. Meditation became central to SES's philosophy programme and MacLaren, together with Roles, was instrumental in founding the School of Meditation (SoM) in London. All senior members of the SES meditate.

=== New leader ===
In 1992 Shantanand Saraswati advised Leon MacLaren to choose a successor. He chose Donald Lambie, a lawyer, who had joined SES at the age of 17 in 1973. Donald Lambie succeeded Leon MacLaren upon his death in 1994. His succession was approved by the 200-strong Fellowship of senior members of the organisation. Sri Shantanand Saraswati died in 1997. Donald Lambie established contact with his successor, Sri Vasudevananda Saraswati, who took on the role of guru to SES. Sri Vasudevananda Saraswati continues to act in that role.

== Artistic endeavours ==
=== Art in Action ===
In 1977, the Art Department at SES began an annual, four-day art festival called Art in Action at Waterperry Gardens; the first event attracted 14,000 visitors and recent events have each attracted about 25,000 visitors. Over the years the number of artists exhibiting increased from 51 to 400, specially selected for the quality of their work. The event also included lectures by experts from the National Association of Decorative and Fine Art Societies, and 3,000 places on practical courses in 20 different subjects. Around 900 volunteers from SES staffed the event. The event was started by steward of Waterperry Estate, Bernard Saunders, and was organised by Jeremy Sinclair CBE between 2005-2014, and later Simon Buchanan

After 40 years, in 2016, the organisers announced that Art in Action would "pause", and that their vision is for Waterperry Gardens to "develop as a centre for the arts in the years to come". Since then the organisation has hosted the Handmade in Britain festival, Celebrating Ceramics, the Oxford Storytelling Festival and the Waterperry Opera Festival.

=== Waterperry frescos ===
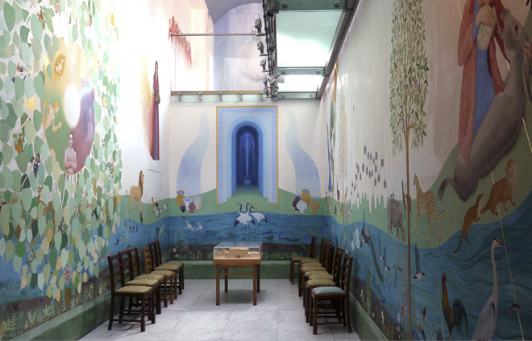
Frescos at Waterperry House

A project by SES architects and artists' groups to plan and construct a new hall at Waterperry House began in 1971. In 1999–2001, frescos spanning three floors, illustrating SES's philosophies, were added to the property to create a sacred space intended to last at least 500 years. The architects and artists let their designs arise from reflection on a passage from one of the great texts of Advaita philosophy, the Brihadaranyaka Unpanishad: "In the beginning this self was indeed Brahman. It knew only itself as 'I am Brahman'. Therefore, it became All." MacLaren's intention was to create a place fit for King Janaka; accordingly the bridge and staircase was planned in glass.

== Children's education ==
In 1975, SES founded the St James Independent Schools in London, comprising one school for girls and one for boys, both catering to children from 4–18 years of age. St Vedast's School for Boys, at Sarum Chase in Hampstead, London, was also founded in the mid-1970s and closed in 1985. Other schools included the Ficino School in Auckland, New Zealand; St James Preparatory Schools in Cape Town, Durban and Johannesburg, South Africa; John Colet School, Sydney, Australia; Erasmus School, Melbourne, Australia; the St James Independent Schools in London; Alcuin School in Leeds (closed in 2009); St James' primary school in Stockport (closed in 2015); and John Scottus School in Dublin. St James Junior Boys merged with the Junior Girls School to form St James Juniors in 2015.

Alongside the regular curriculum, Greek and Eastern Philosophy, Vedic Dancing, Shakespeare, Renaissance art, meditation, mindfulness, Latin, Greek, Sanskrit, Calligraphy, and Vedic Mathematics are taught from an early age. There is also a strong emphasis on sport through team games, music and arts. Children are taught the virtues of politeness, courtesy, truthfulness and honesty.

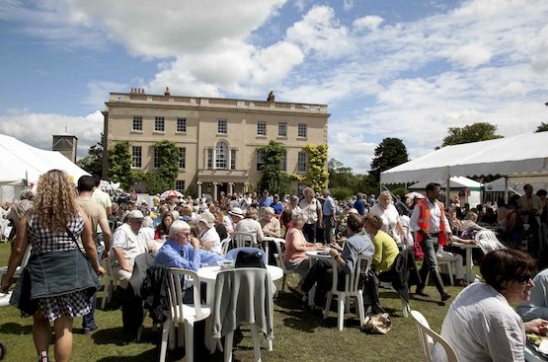
Art in Action festival at Waterperry Gardens

== Child abuse inquiries ==
=== St James and St Vedast schools ===
In the early 1980s the St James and St Vedast schools received complaints from parents and were subject to a critical series of articles in the London Evening Standard, focusing on the School's harsh discipline regime and its links to the School of Economic Science, which the journalists described as a "cult".

In 2005, following complaints on an internet message board set up for former pupils, the Governors of the St James Schools initiated a private inquiry, chaired by British QC, James Townsend, into the allegations. The investigation found that from 1975 to 1985, children had been "criminally assaulted" while attending the schools including unreasonable punishment, assault from teachers and general mistreatment.

In response to the report the school stated the teachers named in the report "will receive disciplinary warnings", but that "there is no plan to remove them from the schools". The teachers no longer work at St James.

==== Inquiry press and media coverage ====
The Inquiry report was publicised by a Channel 4 News television special report on 15 March 2006 and in national and local newspapers. The programme reported that there had been complaints about punishment regimes in 1983 and that meetings had been held with parents which the then headmaster David Boddy also attended. The report also stated that "there has been a real change in the ethos and conduct of the schools is established by the evidence of those witnesses, not naturally well disposed towards the SES, who speak of them as happy places where there appears to be a relaxed atmosphere between pupils and teachers".

In December 2020 the BBC reported that, following legal action launched against the schools in 2016, 45 former students who attended St James and St Vedast between 1975 and 1992 had so far received of up to £30,000 each. All of the cases were settled without an admission of liability and did not come before court. None of the former pupils received an apology.

=== The Plato School ===
The Plato children's school in Amsterdam was founded by the Dutch branch of SES, with close links to the UK St James Schools. It was subject to Dutch Police investigations in 1996 and 2000 into incidents of illegal physical punishments and mistreatment of children. The headteacher of the school was prosecuted and found guilty of assault. The school closed in 2002 after the second police investigation and around the time of a permanent split within the SES in the Netherlands.

== Teachings and practices ==
Teaching at SES is done in small groups with a tutor, following the Socratic tradition, rather than a set course with a curriculum, textbooks and examinations. All of the SES tutors are advanced students and volunteers. Courses include Philosophy, Economics, Art, Vedic Mathematics and Practical Philosophy in Business. SES teaches a variety of 10 week courses, beginning each January, May and September.

=== Practical philosophy ===
SES teaches a philosophy drawn from Eastern and Western traditions. Differing from academic philosophy courses, "SES is closer to the ancients' conception of a philosophy school in which students are taught one particular philosophy or ethical way of life, which they commit to in an effort to completely transform themselves."

An underlying idea is that the great teachings of the world all point to the same central truths, and that wisdom is the key to a better life. Teaching is based on the precepts of Advaita Vedanta as translated, taped and transcribed from interviews in India conducted by MacLaren with Swami Shantanand Saraswati (d.1997), a colleague of Maharishi Mahesh Yogi, from 1961 to 1996.

Advaita means literally "not two"; vedanta refers to the knowledge underlying the creation. Together these are said to explain the essential unity of everything in creation and the source from which it arises. SES considers Advaita to be "the clearest and most systematic expression we have found of the common philosophy that lies at the heart of many of the world's great religions and philosophies". Non-dual philosophy arises from ancient Vedic scriptures expounded by Shankara. This teaching, along with the expansion of it in relation to the modern age by Santanand Saraswati, is the foundation of the philosophy course. The course operates on the principle that the teaching achieves nothing unless put into practice in everyday living. Through practice, it eventually becomes understanding and a part of one's own nature.

The introductory philosophy course draws from a variety of sources, including the Bhagavad Gita, the Upanishads, the Bible, Plato, Marsilio Ficino, Hermes Trismegistus, Shakespeare and Emerson. As students progress through SES they don't learn deeper truths, but gain a deeper understanding of the same truth with which they're presented on the first night.

==== Volunteer work ====
Members are encouraged to do volunteer work with and for fellow students, and for the communities in which they live. Service to fellow human beings, without personal reward or gain, is considered an important part of the organisation's philosophy of seeking the truth.

==== Retreats ====
SES hosts retreats for those students who've graduated from foundation courses. On the retreats, such students spend longer periods of time practising what they've learnt and furthering their study. The retreats provide a setting in which students can dedicate themselves more fully to the philosophy. These can be between 2 and 10 days in length.

=== Economics with Justice ===
SES says that discovering the conditions which allow every individual to find a fulfilling life is the true goal of Economics, and that the current economic situation where "Some men work to maintain others who labour not" is unjust. Rather than the mathematical approach to economics, SES uses a different definition, rooted in the philosophy of Advaita Vedanta. A four-term economics course is taught seeking to show that "Freedom and prosperity are possible for people everywhere, providing we follow economic laws and aim for a fair outcome from economic arrangements".

SES has published its economic theories and principles in a 2013 book "The Science of Economics". It has made written submissions to the Scottish Government Commission on Local Tax Reform, the London Assembly Inquiry into Land Value Taxation for London and the House of Commons, Housing, Communities and Local Government Committee on Land Value Capture. It has been described as "Georgist", but has widened its scope of enquiry beyond George to include financial reform and debt.

=== Meditation ===
SES members are introduced to meditation and given a specific mantra; those who have already been initiated into the Transcendental Meditation technique are allowed to keep their own mantra. SES encourages students to meditate for 30 minutes, twice a day. Students are introduced to meditation in the second year of the course, after which the regular practice of meditation is central to the teachings. There is a simple initiation ceremony as described by one of the organisation's American websites:

In the School, a traditional system of mantra meditation is made available to all students who have taken Philosophy Works followed by the Foundation Courses. Seated comfortably in a balanced and upright position, the activities of the mind and body are brought under observation, and then allowed to fall away as the attention is directed to the sound of the mantra. This results in an experience of quiet stillness. Remaining still and listening to the sound of the mantra is all that is required. The rest unfolds naturally. The introduction to meditation is marked by a simple, dignified ceremony. Students are asked to present traditional offerings of fruit, flowers and a gift of money that is used solely for making meditation available throughout North America. Following the introduction, ongoing assistance is offered in the form of one-on-one tutorials and classroom discussions.

The meditation initiation involves a trained initiator and an initiate who wishes to take up the practice of meditation. The initiator recites verses in Sanskrit and symbolic offerings of fruits and flowers are made. The initiate is asked only to witness the ceremony and is not asked to get involved. This is done to attune the initiate's mind to 'pick up' the sound of the mantra. At the end of the ceremony the initiator becomes silent and begins to intonate the mantra. The initiate is then given the mantra and instruction on how to use it.

=== Renaissance studies ===
Renaissance studies by SES have led to the publication of several works, including translations from Latin of many of Marsilio Ficino's letters. The translators were led by Clement Salaman. SES members have also translated the works of Hermes Trismegistus, after whom Hermetic Philosophy is named.

SES members have contributed to the BBC programmes on renaissance topics, in 2005 providing insights into the historical meaning of the word heaven and its possible implications, and in 2009 on the influence of Plato and Aristotle on the Renaissance.

=== Sanskrit language ===
SES represents the largest body of Sanskrit students in the UK. SES currently teaches Sanskrit from beginner level to IGCSE.

== Administration (UK) ==
Course fees are kept low to encourage recruitment; they are a small part of the organisation's income, while donations and wills have enabled the SES to own substantial properties.

Donald Lambie is supported by a nine-member executive committee elected by the 230-person governing body of the SES, known as the 'Fellowship'. It has 240 'Ordinary Members' and 41 'Associate Members' in its Fellowship. The principal of SES is Ian Mason, a barrister and a global facilitator for the UN Harmony with Nature project.

The Fellowship rules include 6 objects, the first and principal one being:

1. To promote the study of natural laws governing the relations between men in society and all studies related thereto and to promote the study of the laws customs and practices by which communities are governed and all studies there to.

Any person Enrolled on a Philosophy of Economics course can be invited by the executive committee to become an Ordinary Member of the Fellowship.

In the UK courses are held in nearly 50 towns and cities.

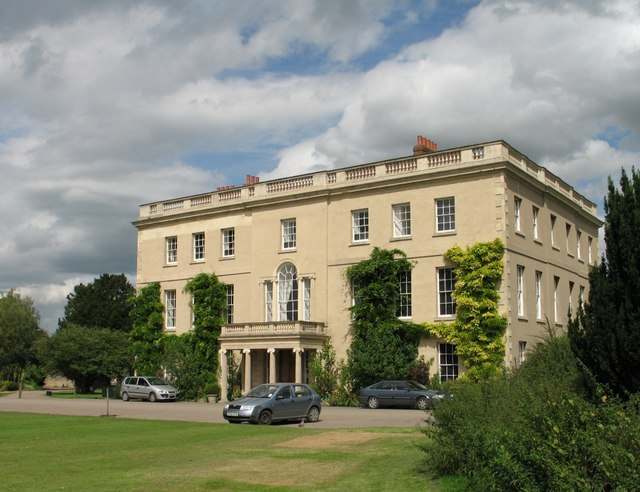
Waterperry House, Oxfordshire, UK

In 1972 the UK branch of SES purchased the Waterperry Estate in Oxfordshire, including its horticultural business, which it continues to run to generate revenue for the SES. In 1986 Nanpantan Hall in Loughborough was bequeathed to the SES, and it also owns Brinscall Hall in Preston, as well as eleven further freehold properties and one long leasehold. These include Mandeville Place in London, SES owns Belmont House in Stockport and Park House in Glasgow. Other properties are in London, Leeds, Croydon, Edinburgh, Guildford and Colchester. In 2005, the SES sold one of its mansions, Sarum Chase in Hampstead, for £9.3 million.

In 2017 the UK charities commission shows the organisation had an income of £5.1m and spending of £4.0m. The organisation also has £15.5m of own use assets, £10.0m of long-term investments, and £2.3m of other assets. The UK organisation has 9 trustees, 98 employees, 500 volunteers and lists its area of operation as the UK. Slightly more than half of the tutors and half the students are female. SES has been described as an "exclusively a British organisation".

Apart from two office staff, all the SES's work is done on a voluntary basis.

== Worldwide operations ==
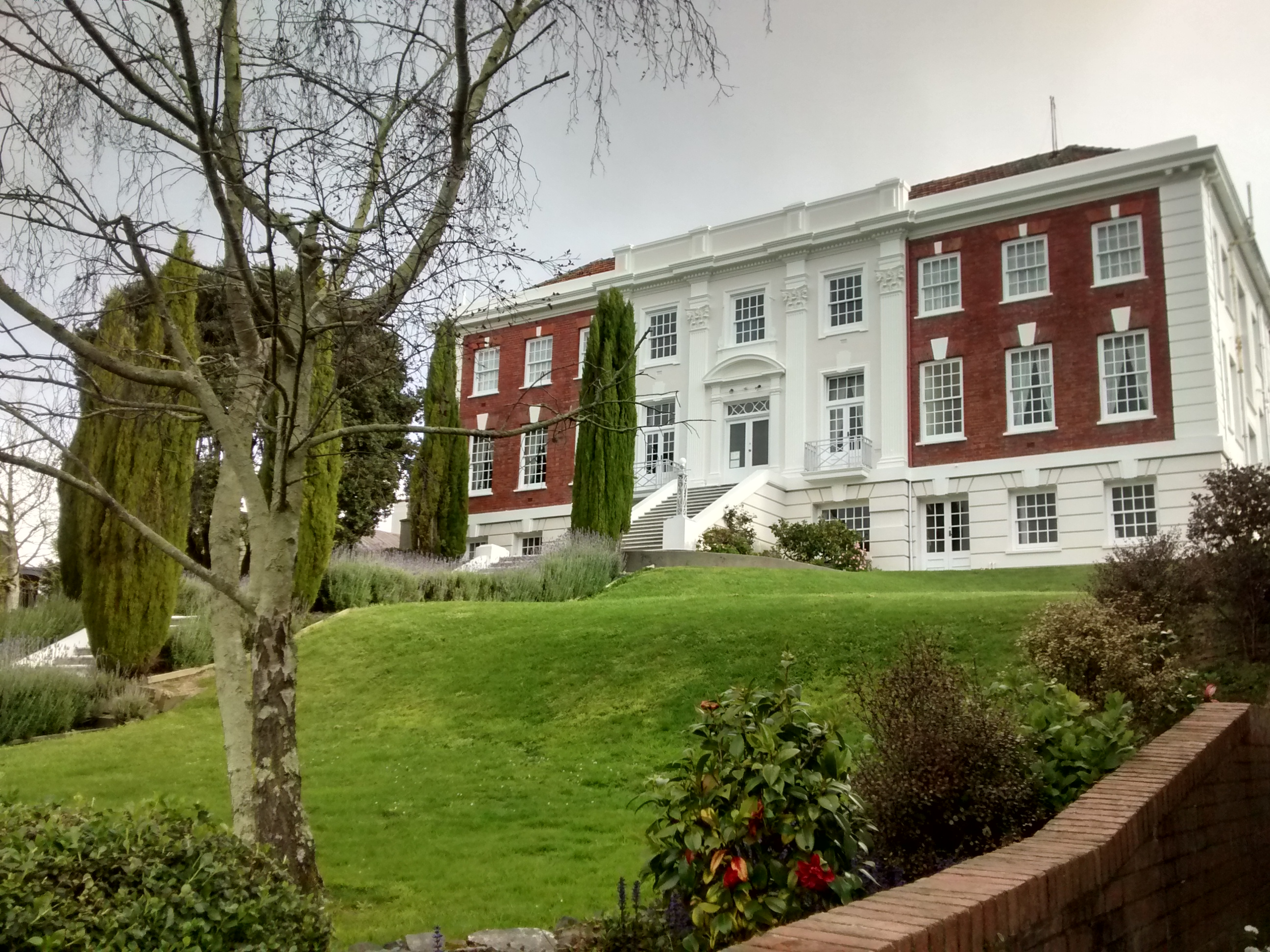
The School of Practical Philosophy, Wellington, New Zealand

SES is one of the most widespread organisations related to Advaita. In addition to the campuses in the United Kingdom, there are several dozen associated branch organisations worldwide, most of which are called the School of Practical Philosophy. The first such operation was established in Wellington, New Zealand, in 1957. Alongside branches in the UK, USA and New Zealand there are branches in 14 other countries: Canada, Venezuela, Australia, South Africa, Trinidad, Belgium, Cyprus, Greece, Holland, Malta, Spain, Ireland, Hungary, Germany, Israel, Fiji and Argentina.

A branch of the organisation called the School of Practical Philosophy opened in 1964 in New York City. The New York facility was launched in 1964 as a not-for-profit. It received tax-exempt status in 1982. It has branches in the Hudson Valley; Rochester, New York; Albany, Georgia; Scottsdale, Arizona; South Florida; San Francisco; Boston; and New Jersey. The main branch is located at 12 East 79th Street in Manhattan. There is an additional property in Wallkill, New York, in a mansion once owned by Marion Borden. It bought an Upper East Side mansion from millionaire Charles Ogden in 1975, and put it on sale in 2014 for $51 million. Many New Yorkers are aware of the School of Practical Philosophy and its 10-week foundation course, Philosophy Works, due to extensive advertising in the subway The Philosophy Works series is offered several times a year.

== Fictional portrayals ==
In 2009 actress and former St James pupil Clara Salaman published Shame On You, a novel based on her own experiences with the school and SES, though both remain unnamed. She described the organisation as "a self-styled, extremely strict, truth-seeking, spiritual society that demanded an extraordinary amount from its members." According to Salaman, 75% to 85% of her book is an account of real events from her own childhood including teachers marrying former pupils and abuse, which led her to contemplate suicide, another girl to attempt suicide, and a third to successfully carry out suicide.

== Publications and comments ==
The organisation has been described in a variety of different ways: a "human potential movement", as providing "mind discipline" for achieving mental quiescence, as a cult, sect or new religious movement, as a non-religious organisation, or a platonic community, a "Gurdjieff fringe group" or neo-Gurdjieffian movement, as "Georgist". Commentators have pointed out that SES members do not consider it to be a religion, rather a philosophy, and some members, for example, may well be committed to mainstream churches. SES state that "Advaita does not stand in the place of religion. Rather, as many students in the School of a religious disposition have found, it has the capacity to expand and deepen an understanding of their own religion, whatever it may be. It is equally valuable for, and applicable to, those who practise no religion." Shantanand Saraswati stated that people do not need to change their religious beliefs to follow the principles of Advaita.

=== Comments from journalists and authors ===
In the early 1960s, British Buddhist teacher and writer Sangharakshita (Dennis Lingwood) returned to England after 20 years in India. His book Moving Against The Stream includes descriptions of SES member Terry Delamare's experience at the organisation during this period. SES is described as "the organisation whose meetings Terry attended most regularly, and whose teachings he took most seriously" during difficult times. The philosophy taught was described as an "amalgam of Western Esoterism and brahminical Advaita Vedanta." "The School's teachings were therefore sufficiently broad...Students moreover were encouraged to read the philosophical and religious classics of both East and West. In particular, it seems, they were encouraged to read Plato". The author states SES regarded the music of Mozart, in particular, as having a positive, spiritualising effect..

In 1983, the day before the UK General Election, reporters Peter Hounam and Andrew Hogg, writing in the London Evening Standard, alleged the SES was a cult infiltrating the Liberal Party. They said it "enforced a severe diet, persecuted women and kept its members closed off from the outside world". They criticised the SES's links to the St James Independent Schools for children and the discipline regime at the children's schools. The articles were described by SES as "largely politically motivated". SES leadership initially chose to ignore these allegations.

In 1984, Hounam and Hogg wrote a book, Secret Cult, which said that the organisation aimed to establish psychological control over its members and had caused personality change, mental breakdown and divorce. They did not consider every SES member to be a cult member; they excluded the thousands that attend only the introductory courses and those in the senior echelons that live normal lives; of concern was a group they called the 'lumpenproletariat' who joined after the religious fervour of the 1960s and are "dependant on SES to make decisions in their lives". They also said the SES was "penetrating the corridors of power" with particular links to the Liberal Party, whose then chairman, Roger Pincham, was an SES member. The book contained a reply from Pincham disputing allegations, and included interviews with ex-students who said they had gained much from their attendance. The authors commented that, in hiding from publicity, the School might have made secrecy its worst enemy. Critics said the book contained errors and had a political agenda against the Liberal Party, which was undermined when it turned out that the spokesman for the SES, David Boddy, had been a press adviser to Conservative Party leader Margaret Thatcher. Shaw (1994) said: "the more obvious conclusion" is that members might be "in the cult simply because they shared the elitist upper-middle-class professional values that the school espoused".

Colin Slee, Provost of Southwark Cathedral, who had contributed to the book and saw the organisation as a cult, in 1999 said he had shifted his attitude and saw it as a New Religious Movement instead.

Journalist William Shaw wrote a 1994 book Spying in Guru Land: Inside Britain's Cults, in which he attended SES along with several other organisations. "In the whole colourfully eccentric splatter of cults, there has never been one as genteel, stiff-upper lipped and absurdly British as the School of Economic Science. In many ways, it's quite the strangest cult I join," Shaw said. He reported that during the introductory course he did not witness brainwashing and that the "yearning dedication of those who stay, turning up week after week in their quest for the big answer to life, is somehow ignored by those in the anti-cult movement who try to tell us that behind the fluty-voiced Miss Crammond lurks a malicious agent of mind control." Characterising Leon MacLaren as authoritarian, he described a "regime of holy servitude—part Gurdjieffian discipline, part oriental mysticism, part Christian mysticism, part social snobbery". Shaw interviewed "Giles", a former SES tutor, who blamed SES for losing two relationships and that he "suffered a complete mental breakdown, during which he says he came very close to suicide."

In 1994 Religious Studies Lecturer at the University of Wolverhampton, George Chryssides wrote: SES does not consider itself to be a religion, it runs classes in philosophy, "by which is meant Vedic philosophy", with some Christian and Esoteric elements, together with the practice of meditation. It is an exclusively British organisation.

Writing in The Independent in 1995, in an article titled Philosophy for grown-ups, Hester Lacey described how a diverse group of 50 people attended a philosophy class at SES. Lacey listed the motivations of some participants including: "I started coming because I felt there had to be more to life", "You need to take care of your mind and soul", "The class is like being at a big, brilliant dinner party and not being stuck beside one person all evening","As an actor, the more I understand others, the better I can do my job", "I work in a hospital, and these classes are very much like the group therapy sessions we run". Lacey points out "None of the teachers is paid, and there are no exams; the pupils study simply for the enjoyment of the lessons."

Sociologist of religion David V. Barrett, in his 2001 book The New Believers based partly on interviews with David Boddy, described SES as not a religion, but as having a distinctive philosophy which draws on elements of Christianity and esoteric origins and beliefs but is largely Eastern. The path of the SES is "a case of personal development rather than attaining knowledge". He points out SES follows the teaching of the Shankaracharya because they say "his wisdom, which we have followed, works".

Writing in the Times in 2008, journalist Richard Morrison, observed that SES was behind Oxfordshire arts festival, Art in Action. He states "I know people who have found the SES to be a helpful and entirely benign influence on their lives; and others who have encountered it and found it weird. Not for a moment do I expect Art in Action to be anything other than a showcase for high-quality craft skills."

In 2010, Ariel Kiminer of The New York Times reported on her attendance of an introductory course for which 400 people signed up. She said that passengers on the New York City Subway were familiar with its advertising placard which stated: "This poster can make you happier than any other". Attendees were "young immigrants and wizened retirees, pretty actresses and tired parents" and that it was touching that "so many people from so many backgrounds join in the pursuit of wisdom". She said fellow attendees recounted the effect of the classes on their lives with candour and eloquence, and that the teaching was "not esoteric but practically conventional wisdom." After the initial meetings, attendance fell off considerably and she started to dread it; however whenever she would lose patience with the instruction, "one of the students would talk about incorporating these lessons into life, and the honesty and eloquence would win me over again." Commenting on allegations that it is a cult, she said: "If so, it must be an unsuccessful one: no one tried to sign me up for the next course, let alone get me to donate my earthly possessions." Kiminer stopped attending the course and doing 'The Exercise', and said: "I do still think about what I give my attention to, though. And I do still feel touched by the enthusiasm of the other students."

In 2011, M. H. Miller of The New York Observer considered the organisation's practices to be "obscure bordering on impenetrable", but describes the central tenets as "through meditation, achievement of happiness and higher self-awareness–the school warns against the pollution of a scattered mind and cautions students to rid themselves of 'unnecessary thoughts'–and the belief in a universal connectedness that can be tapped into". Quoting former members the article said the organisation had caused divorce and child abuse and that its leadership had ingrained sexism and homophobia; also that the organisation seeks to "gain control over students by a slow process of conflating obedience to God with obedience to those who claim to know God–that is, S.E.S. and its "tutors.". The author says SES "follow a hierarchical structure in which students advance to new levels of study with money and time, but are not told the specifics of what awaits them when they do." On investigating the attendees the author notes there was a mix of ethnicities and even split between men and women, most in their 40s. The author attended a philosophy class and found it to be sold out, the students motivation for attending included finding "Purpose in life. A higher level of understanding in my existence" and to "To learn how to live again"

In his 2012 book Confusion No More, Vedanta teacher and disciple of Nisargadatta, Ramesh S Baleskar, includes the accounts of a student at the SES branch in Holland. The student had been at the group for 12 years and describes it as inviting and stimulating resulting in a "complete change in the way I looked at things".The philosophy course is described as involving a "lot of practising, exercises, meditation - a lot of volition", "there were some very clear experiences of peace of mind". His experiences led him to further explore Advaita.

In his 2013 book Philosophy for Life: And other dangerous situations, Jules Evans said the SES relationship with an Indian guru was key to its development, because its members "like Plato himself, were trying to invent a religion." Describing the historical abuse of SES children confirmed in a 2006 report, he said that they often received no sympathy from their parents because of their membership of the "deeply hierarchical organization". He added that the day schools are today "apparently run a lot better now by professional teachers, attracting the children of well-to-do parents" and that there has been a shift towards the mainstream of society. Evans also reported that 18-year-old St. James School girls were introduced to older SES members at two specially arranged parties and that Principal Ian Mason and SES Leader Donald Lambie have both married former St. James girls; Evans said that the organisation wanted to encourage in-group marriage to preserve its values, Mason pointed out the women in question were adults in their 20s when married, nevertheless Mason admitted "It's a bit weird." Evans concluded, "I personally don't think SES is a 'secret cult'. It has lost its charismatic and authoritarian Leader. Its membership is declining", "SES seems to me to be an interesting experiment, an interesting attempt to turn Eastern and Western ancient philosophy into a genuine community and way of life". In 2012, he said SES is "a neo-platonic sect which tries to bring its members closer to a divine union" similar to the communities created by Plato and Pythagoras that had the aim of completely transforming personalities, "close to what we would think of today as religious cults".

In 2019, a writer for The Outline enrolled on an introductory course. She reported that "There was something surreal about leaving work on Thursday evening and taking the subway to a mansion where I would be told a bunch of weird lies." She read Secret Cult midway through the course and commented that "it was hard to square its horror stories with the SPP, which, like a lot of Americanised British things, wasn't quite as compelling as the original." The reviewer opined that it seemed strange the SPP had so much money and attributed it to low overhead. She observed that "teachers are unpaid, students perform custodial work, and the SPP owns its own building."

=== Comments from members and ex-members ===
In 1963, writing in Land & Liberty, A. J. Carter describes coming "into contact with one of the most important influences on my development" at SES. The economics programme introduced him to, land-value tax and Progress and Poverty, by which "a vital seed was sown, but it was not yet to flower". The philosophy course he describes as "directly and indirectly, altered my whole outlook on the deepest aspects of life."

On 26 May 1982, Roger Pincham, who had been a member since 1955, wrote a letter to The Evening Standard challenging criticisms made by Hounam and Hogg. He said that an account based on a few students, or on reporters' attendance at programmes on two or three occasions, could not present a balanced view. He said that thousands of students have attended the programme over the preceding four decades and most have gathered great value from doing so. He added that the authors had mischaracterised the relationship between SES, the independent day schools founded by some of its members, and the Liberal Party, suggesting that the journalists had distrusted the organisation simply because it was "new and rather unusual".

Commenting on the book Secret Cult, SES member and author Brian Hodgkinson responded to its allegation that the programme encourages "destroying the personality". He said that description conceals the actual focus of the teaching, which is to free the mind from the limitations imposed by the ego. He added that "of course, no actual force was used. The whole teaching of the school is word of mouth. Anyone can walk away from a School meeting or event at any time. Some do!" Hodgkinson wrote a history of the SES called In Search of Truth: The Story of the School of Economic Science, published in 2010. It included details of its economic and philosophical thought, and examination of positive and negative aspects of the organisation. In response to reports that some people had become emotionally disturbed while attending the programme, he stated that such cases may have been caused by "outside circumstances, such as family relationships or careers" or pre-existing mental health problems. He added, "When they sought help from School tutors, the advice given may sometimes have exacerbated the situation, but there have been a great deal more cases where tutors' help has been much appreciated."

In 2019, actress Emily Watson spoke of her upbringing in SES, which she described as "a quasi-religious organisation/cult" where people are "taught to think a certain way about the world, and about yourself, that is very denigrating to the individual and to women." When Watson took the role for Breaking the Waves (1996) the SES "told me to go on my undignified way," which she said she found "terribly painful" but didn't tell anyone, only confiding in her co-star in 2018. She said that she drew from her SES experience for Chernobyl in that it explores the resistance to a dogmatic culture: "I related very strongly to that; being within a system where you were supposed to think a certain way and you weren't really allowed to think any other way. And breaking out of that is a very, very powerful release in your life." In 2014, she described the SES central teaching of Advaita Vedanta as "a kind of spiritual communism where everyone is one and the same ... which in principle is great but [it was] an organisation that had a lot of problems." At its day school, she said children were treated with "a sort of emotional cruelty that was utterly out of place in a place of education that purports to be based on love and understanding." In 2020, she described SES members as believing "that they are in the one true light and everybody else is in the darkness" and knows "the effect that that has on people's sense of power and self-worth".

In her 2002 book, Nothing Left Over: A Plain and Simple Life, Tionette Lippe, who attended SES, describes how she remained in this organisation for a "considerable number of years, studying the philosophy of many of the world's great traditions, and what I heard and put into practice there laid the groundwork for the rest of my life". Her own philosophy of wanting to be of service to other people and share with them whatever has comes her way, to live so that supply does not exceed demand or consumption, and to trust that the universe will respond to you in the same way that you respond to it, is of no surprise as she "began my training at a place called the School of Economic Science!"

In a 2006 interview with Oprah Winfrey, actor Hugh Jackman said he had been a member of the School of Practical Philosophy since 1991. He said, "now I meditate twice a day for half an hour. In meditation, I can let go of everything. I'm not Hugh Jackman. I'm not a dad. I'm not a husband. I'm just dipping into that powerful source that creates everything." In a 2010 interview Jackman said: "Really, the spiritual pillar for me has become the School of Practical Philosophy. I'm a regular attendee there and I suppose that has become my church." Jackman has stated he is a devout Christian, active in his local Anglican church, but in addition to following this religion he also follows the School of Economic Science, stating "I just find the evangelical church too, well, restrictive. But the School of Practical Philosophy is nonconfrontational", "We believe there are many forms of scripture", "What is true is true and will never change, whether it's in the Bible or in Shakespeare. It's about oneness. Its basic philosophy is that if the Buddha and Krishna and Jesus were all at a dinner table together, they wouldn't be arguing. There is an essential truth. And we are limitless."

In her 2009 book The Power Within, MacLaren's secretary Dorine Tolley wrote: "The philosophy course he (MacLaren) had developed over the years had slowly become a life-changing method with all its consequences. The advertisements were not explicit enough and did not indicate that one's habitual patterns of life would come under scrutiny.". "In spite of attempts to malign Leon MacLaren and his methods his critics were vastly outnumbered by his supporters and none of the sceptics have ever been able to explain why so many thousands of discerning people flocked to the school".

In 2012, political advertiser Jeremy Sinclair, chairman of M&C Saatchi, told The Drum that outside of work, his other passion is teaching at the SES. "The philosophy that I teach is to be useful, and not just about mind expanding," he said. He added that it has "heavily influenced" his book, Brutal Simplicity of Thought. His colleague Tim Bell thought SES gave Sinclair a sense of equilibrium, keeping him well enough balanced that he never got affected by blowups at the agency. In 2013, Martha Dewing, raised Episcopalian, said studying Advaita Vedanta at the School of Practical Philosophy in New York changed the way she saw her inherited faith, stating "It opened me up and broadened my perspective" and "I see a bigger Jesus. I see what he meant rather than what they say he said.".

=== Comments from SES ===
In 2011, invited by a reporter to reply to allegations that SES and its branches are a cult, spokeswoman Monica Vecchio said: "I've known Mr MacLaren for many years," referring to SES leader Leon MacLaren. "I met him when I was a very young woman in my 20s. For anybody to call anything Mr MacLaren started a cult is just ridiculous. I've never met a man who was more a man in the greatest sense of the word than Mr MacLaren was." In 2012, David Boddy, former SES spokesman and Thatcher press secretary, describes MacLaren as "my first mentor" and "first real teacher". "He knew things others didn't appear to know, and he was totally fearless when it came to proclaiming them. He couldn't abide 'experts' or religion but he did believe that humankind could be lifted out of its torpor and misery by the power of philosophy, or love of wisdom." He said "the London Evening Standard sought to brand MacLaren a 'cult leader' because of his Indian connections." The book led to "severe misunderstanding, and in some cases libel and slander". He pointed out that "the School of Economic Science, which has never had a political or religious agenda; it is, in fact, a rather interesting, if somewhat pedantic, philosophical school in the classical Platonic tradition."

According to the SES's 2013 website, its critics "greatly misrepresent the aims and activities of the School, but they have alerted it to the need to provide more information about the way its courses and associated activities progress." SES representative Ian Mason responded to criticism in Jules Evans's 2013 book. He said: "The idea is not to break down the ego for the sake of it, but rather to put you in touch with yourself, to help you distinguish what's real or not, and to nourish and strengthen the mind. But perhaps there was too unquestioning an attitude to the leader in those earlier years. People took things that MacLaren said and applied them without intelligence." About the parties reported by Evans, Mason said, "The balls were a response to requests from young women for opportunities to meet some eligible young men in the SES and were pretty innocent occasions. I should emphasise that there was no coercion involved." In a 2013 interview, Mason stated that life is a voyage of discovery and deepening understanding and the courses are designed to support this. The participants are the judges as to the successes of the programmes, no certifications are offered, and the aim is to liberate people.

== Notable members ==
Notable current members include M&C Saatchi chairman Jeremy Sinclair CBE, actor Hugh Jackman, and Canadian entrepreneur Douglas Freeman. Notable former members include actress Emily Watson and author Laura Wilson, both of whom were brought up in the SES by their parents; David Boddy, former press secretary to Margaret Thatcher; and Richard Stokes, politician.

== Publications ==
- Letters of Marsilio Ficino Vol 1 – Vol 10
- Reminders, Extracts from Lectures by Leon MacLaren
- Self Illumination, a translation of Sri Sankara Acarya's Svaatmaprakasikaa
- The Teaching of Reality: A Translation of Shankara's Tattvopadesha
- The Eternal Way: An English translation of Sadacaranusandhanam, attributed to Sankara
- Reflections of Brahman: Brahmanucintanam, Sri Sankara Acarya, a new translation
- The Teachings of Astavakra
- London Language Lectures 2009-2012
- Leon MacLaren: Reminders
- Music: The Foundations of Harmony
- Nature of Society
- Justice – The transcript of a lecture delivered on 19 December 1951 by Leon MacLaren.
- One World One Wealth – Exploring the Possibilities of Economics with Justice
- Dialectic – Five principles are presented using the Platonic Dialogues
- The Dhatupatha of Panini, Practical Aid for the Study of Sanskrit Dhatus
- Sanskrit Dictionary Page-Finder
- Sanskrit for Philosophy Students Vols. 1–3
- The Laws of Manu, a new translation.
- Nine Vedic Prayers and the Alphabet (CD)
- Sounds of Sanskrit (CD)
- Isha Upanishad (CD), Music performed by School Choir and Orchestra
- His Holiness Sri Shantananda Saraswati on Love (CD)
- His Holiness Shantananda Saraswati & Mr. MacLaren (CD)
- Going Home (DVD)
- Philosophy for Life (DVD)

== See also ==
- Advaita Vedanta
- Neo-Vedanta
- Leon MacLaren
- George Gurdjieff
- P. D. Ouspensky
- Transcendental Meditation movement
- New religious movement
- Spiritual bypass
- Maharishi Mahesh Yogi
- Andrew McLaren (Labour politician)
- Adi Shankara
- Henry George
