= The Study Society =

British charity registered 1951 promotes meditation

Coordinates: 51.490573°N 0.214508°W

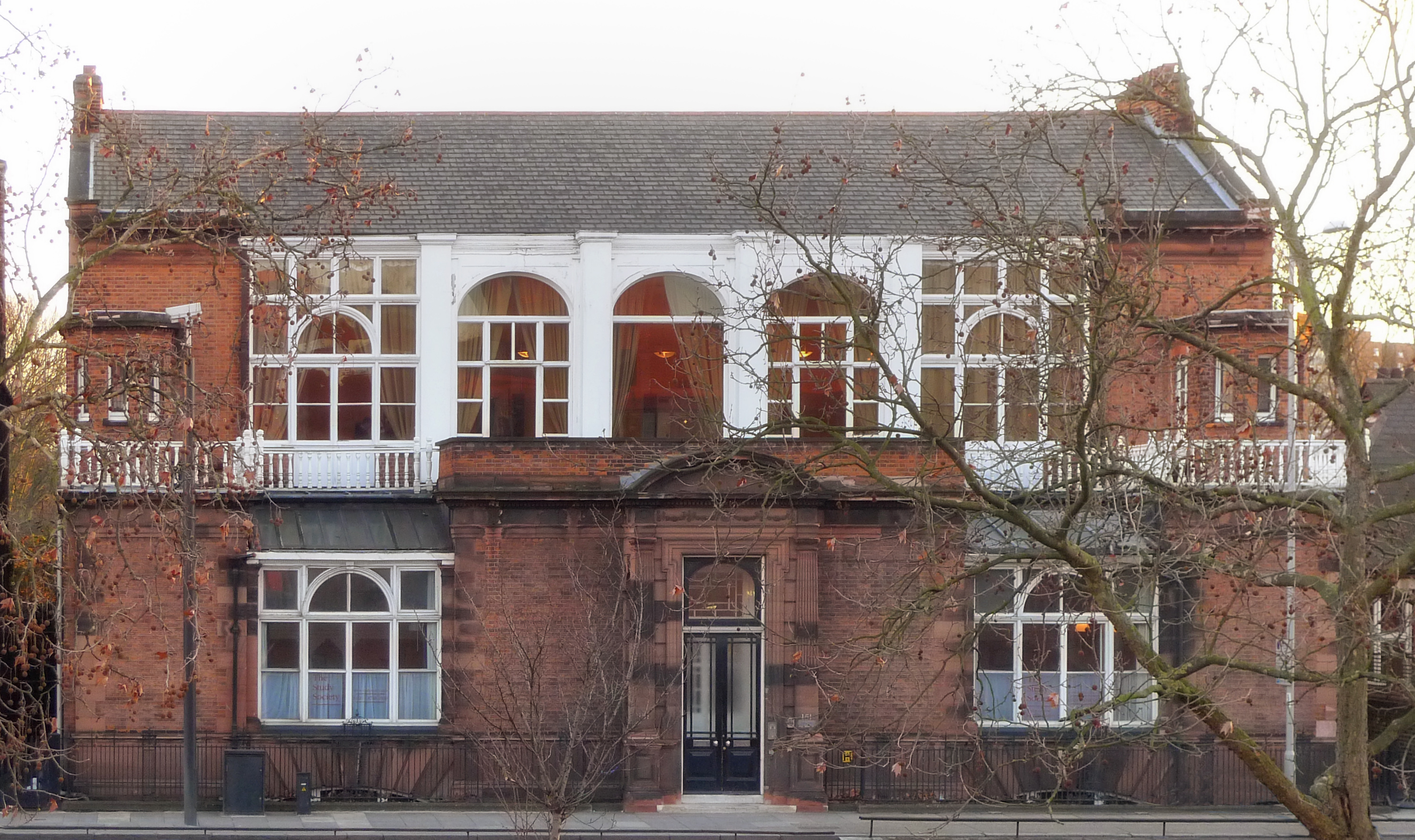
Colet House

The Study Society is a British charity. Its stated objects are for the public benefit:

1. to advance the education of the public in religion, science, philosophy and the arts.
2. the promotion of moral and spiritual welfare.

It is based at Colet House, Barons Court, London.

== History ==
The Society was registered in 1951 by Dr Francis C. Roles, four years after the death of his teacher, the Russian philosopher P. D. Ouspensky, who had settled in England in 1921. The Society was set up to continue Ouspensky's work as a "School of the Fourth Way".

== Practices and teachings ==
=== Fourth Way ===
The Fourth Way is a concept used by G. I. Gurdjieff to describe an approach to self-development learned over years of travel in the East that combined what he saw as three established traditional "ways," or "schools" into a fourth way. These three ways were of the body, mind and emotions. According to his principles and instructions, Gurdjieff's method for awakening one's consciousness is different from that of the fakir, monk or yogi, so his discipline is called the ‘Fourth Way’. His pupil Ouspensky, from 1924 to 1947 made the term and its use central to his own teaching of Gurdjieff's ideas, and after Ouspensky's death, his students published a book titled The Fourth Way based on his lectures.

P. D. Ouspensky had developed his system of Self-discovery from the fundamental idea that ordinary human consciousness is incomplete and that it is possible for it to evolve further by personal effort and understanding. Historically, this approach has generally been confined to closed orders, religious or otherwise and directed to the development of one particular human faculty: intellectual, emotional or physical. Ouspensky promoted the practice of a ‘Fourth Way’, whereby ordinary people, remaining engaged in life, could work on all three aspects simultaneously. His teaching asserts the unity of the individual with the whole cosmos in both structure and potential.

In Russia, Ouspensky had learned a system of knowledge and practice from Gurdjieff and until his death in 1947 Ouspensky devoted his life to further developing this system in the light of his own ideas. He established large groups of pupils in London at Colet House and in New York. He believed that the system was incomplete, lacking a simple method to allow the ideas to develop naturally into behaviour and experience.

=== The Movements ===
The Movements were introduced to the United Kingdom by Mme Ouspensky in the 1930s, when they were taught to Ouspensky’s pupils at Lyne Place, Virginia Water and at Colet House. The Movements were originally called Sacred Dances, Prayers and Exercises, and were known only in certain monasteries, temples, closed communities and esoteric orders scattered throughout the Middle East, the Hindu Kush and Tibet. During his travels in the late 19th and early 20th centuries, Gurdjieff learned these sacred dances and their original music at their diverse sources and brought them together into a single repertoire which he then taught to his students in Europe.

=== Meditation ===
Dr Roles continued with Ouspensky’s teaching for 13 years but in 1960, as a result of Ouspensky’s instruction to search for ‘the source of the system’, he met Maharishi Mahesh Yogi in London. He recognised the mantra meditation that the Maharishi was disseminating as the simple method that Ouspensky had told him to find. The Study Society was instrumental in setting up the Maharishi’s seminal lecture to 5000 people at the Royal Albert Hall in 1961 which greatly raised his profile in Europe. Meditation was the inspiration of a group of Indian sages the most prominent of whom was Swami Brahmananda Saraswati, Guru Deva. Nevertheless, it was not until Dr Roles was introduced to Swami Shantanand Saraswati, Shankaracharya of Jyotirmath—the head of the Advaita tradition in Northern India whose teaching of the non-dual philosophy of the Vedanta complemented and completed all he had learnt before—that he became convinced that his search was over.

Dr Roles is described as one of three men responsible for meditation being practised so widely in the west due to his early adoption of the practice and propagation of it via The Study Society, the other two men being Maharishi Mahesh Yogi and Leon Maclaren. Dr Roles provided the School of Meditation, which was set up in 1961 following the Maharishi's visit to London, with guidance on the method of meditation during its early years.

=== Mevlevi Turning of the Whirling Dervishes ===
In 1963 the Society formed a connection with Resuhi Baykara, a leader of the Mevlevi Tradition in Istanbul who trained members of the Society in the discipline of Sufi Whirling Dance. This Sufi discipline, originated by the 13th century mystic Jalāl ad-Dīn Muhammad Rūmī is said to provide a means of acquiring inner stillness. The ceremony of the sema, or Mukabele takes place regularly at Colet House.

== Activities ==
The Study Society provides:

- Study groups in which the teachings of P. D. Ouspensky, Shantanand Saraswati and Dr F. C. Roles are discussed, as well as the philosophy of Non-Duality.
- Teaching and practice of meditation.
- Mevlevi Turning (Sufi Whirling Dance) and study of the poetry and music of the Mevlevi tradition.
- Public lectures.

== See also ==
- Nicolai Legat
