= St James Independent Schools =

Private day school in London, England

Coordinates: 51°26′31″N 0°19′53″W

Location
- Earsby Street, London W14 8SH; Church Road, Ashford, Surrey TW15 3DZ; England

Information
- Type: Private day school
- Established: 1975
- Heads: David Brazier, Emma Bell, Hilary Wyatt
- Gender: Boys and Girls
- Age: 2 to 18
- Website: stjamesschools.co.uk
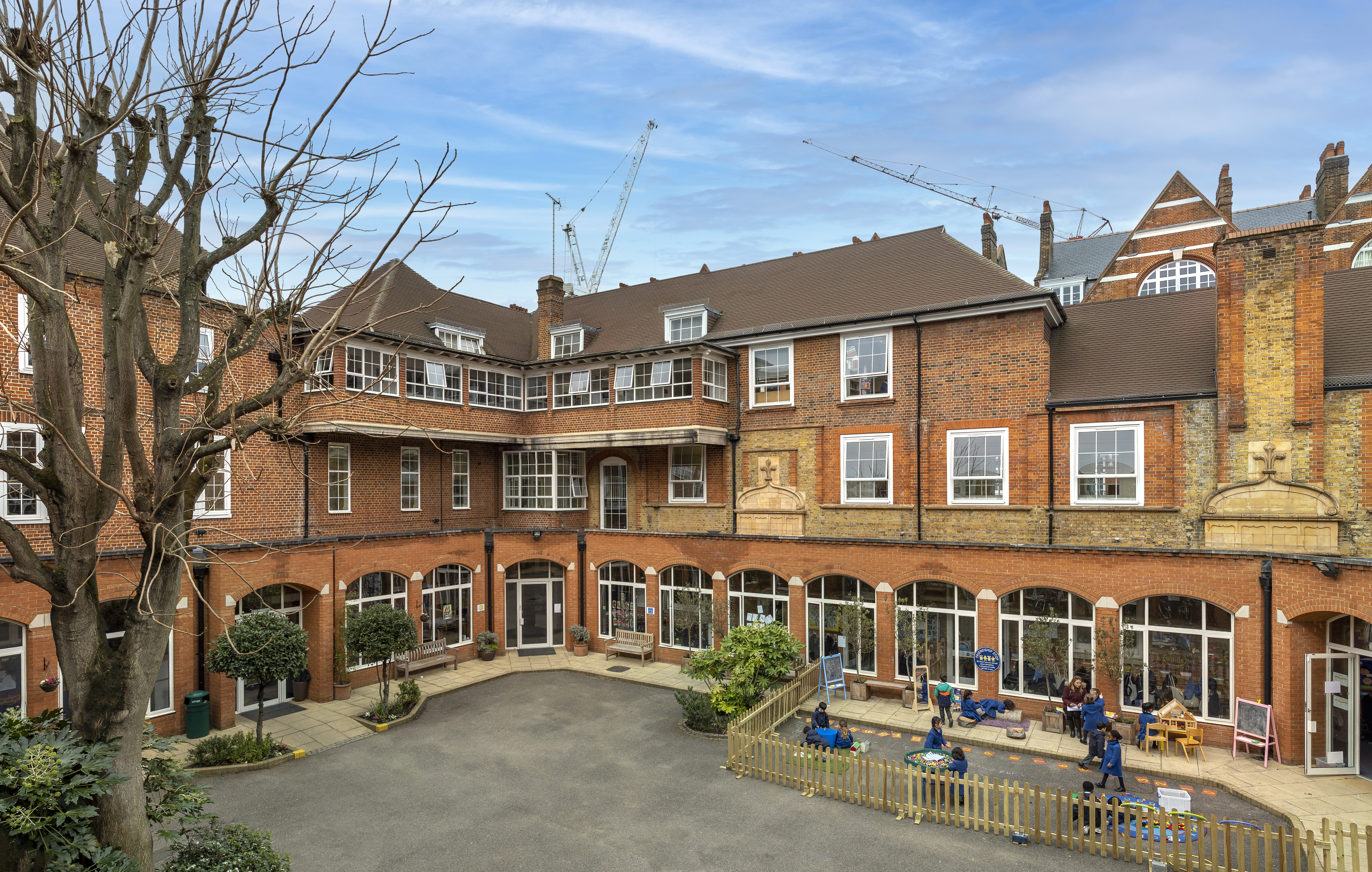
- Preparatory and Senior Girls' School

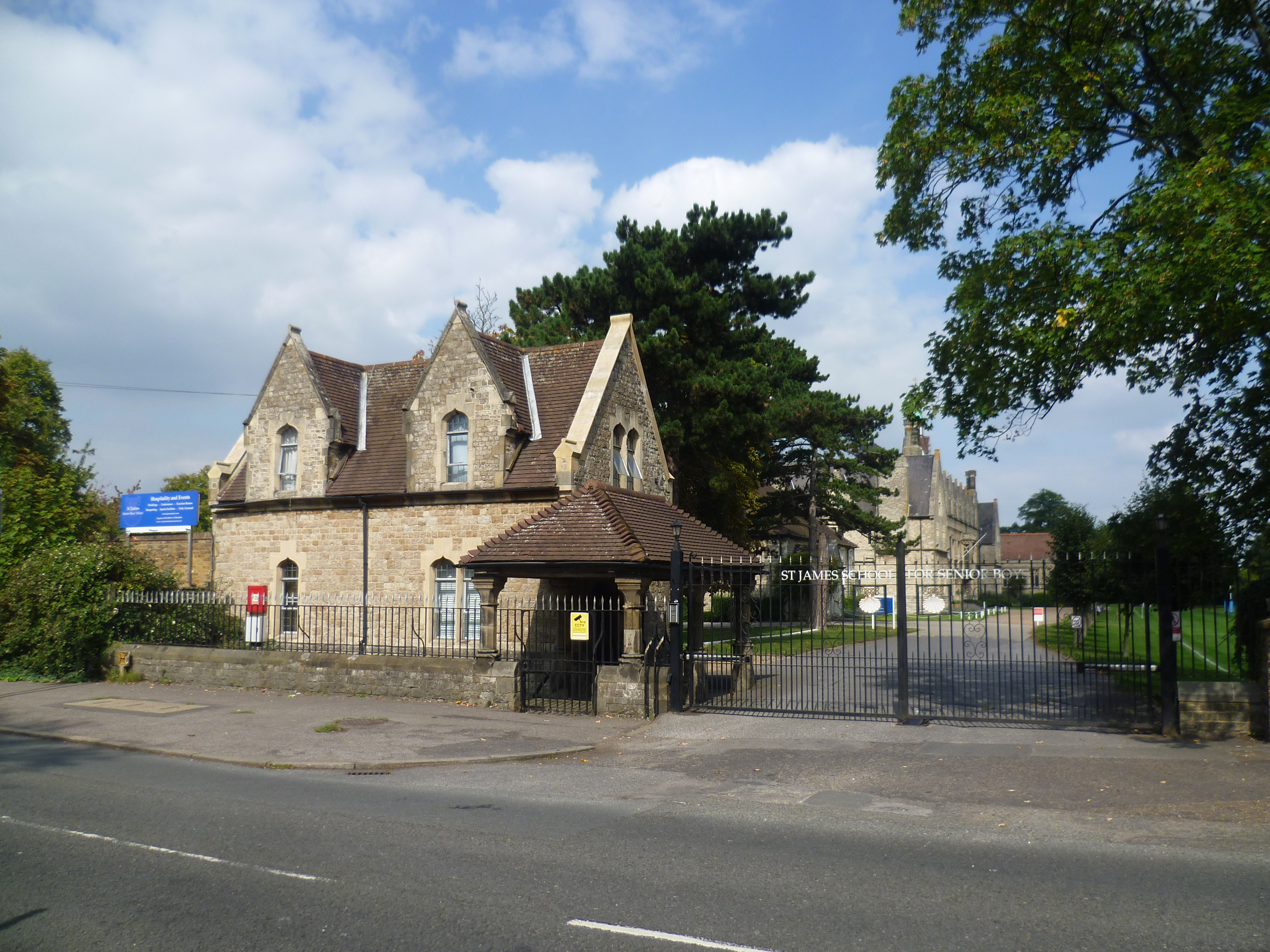
- Senior Boys' School

St James Independent Schools are three fee-paying schools in England for children aged 2 to 18. The Nursery, Preparatory and Senior Girls' Schools are in the London Borough of Hammersmith and Fulham, and the Senior Boys' School in Ashford, Surrey. The boys' school site was previously home to St David's School for Girls.

In 2019 The Times UK School Guide ranked St James' Senior Girls School 102nd with 82.1% scoring A*-B at A-Level, and St James' Senior Boys 251st with 75.9% scoring A*- B at A-level.

== Meditation and mindfulness ==
The St James Schools incorporate stillness, meditation and reflection techniques into the school routine.

== Sanskrit Language ==
Unusually for a UK school, the St James Schools teach Sanskrit., which is a compulsory second language for the prep students. Paul Moss, previous Headmaster of the school, says: "The Devanagri script and spoken Sanskrit are two of the best ways for a child to overcome stiffness of fingers and the tongue. Today’s European languages do not use many parts of the tongue and mouth while speaking or many finger movements while writing, whereas Sanskrit helps immensely to develop cerebral dexterity through its phonetics."

Students of St James chanted Vedic hymns in the presence of Elizabeth II at Buckingham Palace in 2010 to celebrate the beginning of the Commonwealth Games.

== Connection with the School of Economic Science ==
The School of Economic Science, through associated overseas schools, supports independent children's schools in a number of countries, including Australia, New Zealand, Ireland, the West Indies and the United States.

The St James Schools are legally independent from the School of Economic Science. They aim to preserve their founding philosophical principles which are derived from the Advaita Vedanta philosophical tradition, which the schools describe as encompassing the concept of unity, and of a multicultural approach which embraces all faiths – and no faith. Philosophy is taught and transcendental meditation is an optional practice in the schools.

Today, only around 10 per cent of the children have parents involved with SES.

== Criticisms ==
In the early 1980s the London Evening Standard ran a critical series of articles focusing on the School's discipline regime and its links to the School of Economic Science.

An independent inquiry into mistreatment of pupils between 1975 and 1985 at St James' and its then sister school St Vedast's, which closed in 1985, was funded by the schools and chaired by James Townend QC. The report, published in January 2006, concluded that "mental and physical mistreatment" of some pupils had occurred, including "criminal assaults" by teachers, during the ten-year period considered by the inquiry. Townend's report also found that throughout this period the schools' management and governors were failing to the extent that they "were not in any real sense in charge of the Schools".

In his conclusion, Townend stated that there had been "a real change of ethos and conduct of the schools" since the period of abuses he identified in his report.

In December 2020 a BBC News report stated that nearly £1m in compensation had been paid to dozens of former students at St James and St Vedast schools following historical allegations of abuse.

Following the legal action, which was launched against the school in 2016 and concluded 3 years later in 2019, the BBC also reported that 45 former students who attended the schools between 1975 and 1992 had so far received payments of up to £30,000 each,

As part of that legal process, the Settlement Agreement also agreed upon two non-financial terms.

1) Each pupil involved in the settlement agreement would receive a personal letter of apology from the School, for what they endured during those years. Those letters were subsequently sent and signed by Jeremy Sinclair The current Chair of Trustees of St James Schools.

2) A Bust of the Former headmaster of the School, Mr Nicholas Debenham, was to be removed from the school, and its premises.

Both of these terms were met, in accordance with the settlement agreement.

== Former schools ==
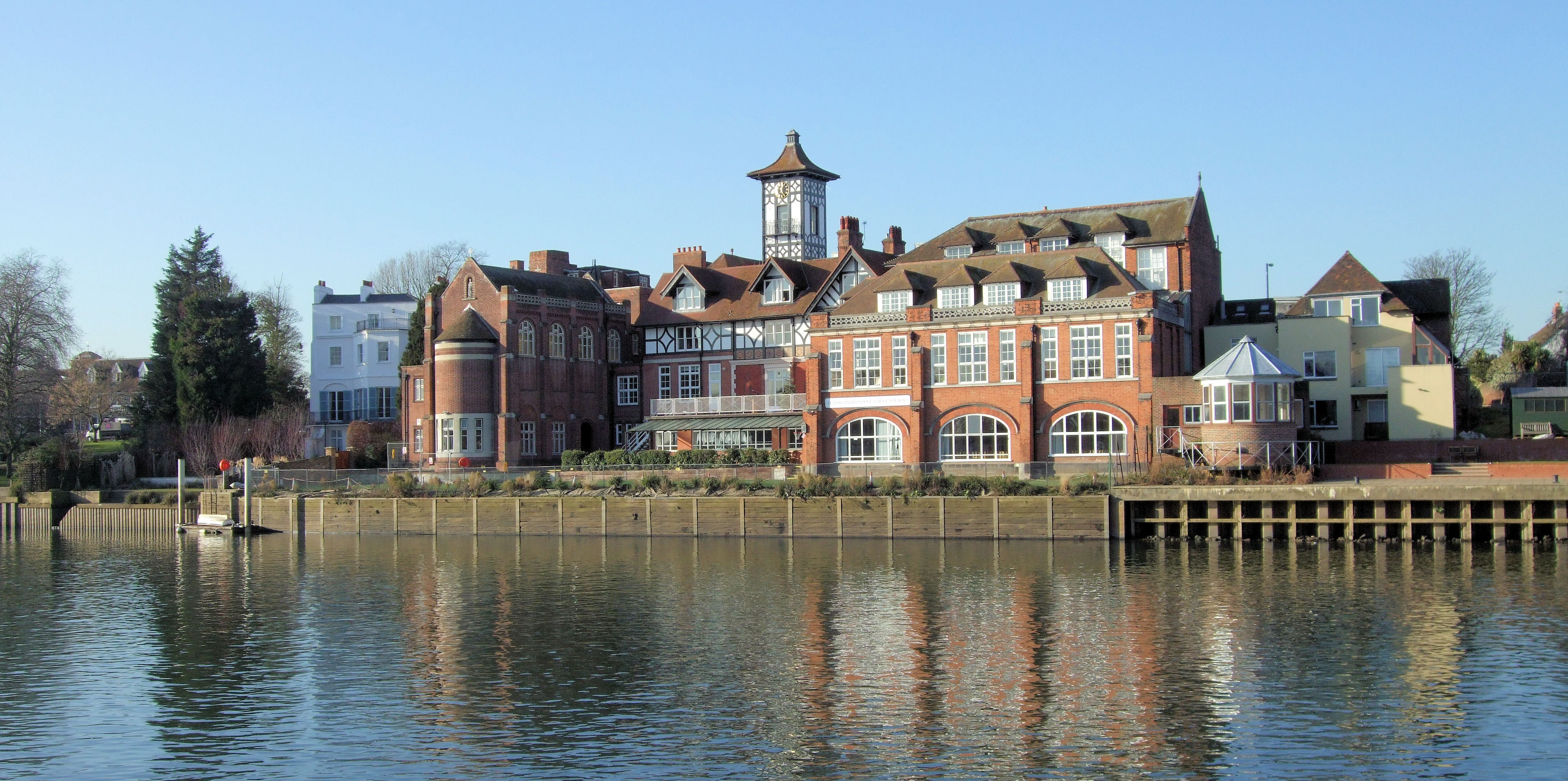
Former site of the Senior Boys School at Pope's Villa, Twickenham

St Vedast's School for Boys, at Sarum Chase in West Heath Road, Hampstead, London, was sold in January 2005 for £9,300,000. The building is now a private residence.

== Notable former pupils ==
Notable former pupils include:

- Nida Manzoor, director.
- Clara Salaman, actress, The Bill
- Emily Watson, actress, star of Breaking the Waves and Appropriate Adult
