= Leon MacLaren =

British philosopher

Leon MacLaren, born Leonardo da Vinci MacLaren (24 September 1910 – 24 June 1994), was the founder of the School of Economic Science (SES). MacLaren was inspired by Henry George, Socrates, Francis Roles, Pyotr Ouspensky, Maharishi Mahesh Yogi, and finally the philosophy of Advaita Vedānta through the Shankaracharyas of Jyotir Math.

== Early life ==
MacLaren was born in Glasgow on 24 September 1910, but from the age of four grew up in the London suburb of Wimbledon. He was the son of Andrew MacLaren, a Labour Member of Parliament who was a staunch advocate of Henry George.

Schooled at Rutlish School in Wimbledon, MacLaren later became attracted to the law and trained as a barrister.

Maclaren said he was grateful to have inherited from his father three things: no religion, no education, and a strong desire to distrust experts.

At the age of sixteen, MacLaren contemplated how his life could best be put to the service of mankind, a one-word answer came to his mind, the word was "School". Describing the experience when he was siting by a lake in Wimbledon Park when he says:

It became very clear to me that there was such a thing as truth, and there was such a thing as justice, and that they could be found and, being found, could be taught. It seemed to me that that was the most valuable thing that one could pursue. So I resolved to pursue this when I was twenty-one.

Years later, in 1936, aided by his father Andrew MacLaren, he began an economic study group based on the Socratic method of inquiry that became The School of Economic Science.

MacLaren believed that the practical problems of the world could best be solved by transforming the nature of human beings.

== Career ==
MacLaren's influences include his father Andrew MacLaren, Shantanand Saraswati, Henry George, Georges Ivanovich Gurdjieff, P. D. Ouspensky, Francis Roles and Maharishi Mahesh Yogi. According to the Henry George Foundation, MacLaren joined the Henry George movement in London in 1931, serving on the executive committee from 1933 until 1937. At the 1936 International Conference of Georgist Organisations held in London, a contingent from the US presented a question-based method of teaching Henry George's ideas. MacLaren created a similar method and taught the course in London. In 1937 MacLaren left the Henry George movement and founded the School of Economic Science (SES) with the support of his father. In 1938 he was called to the bar and practised in Chambers at 2 Paper Buildings in the Inner Temple. In 1939 he was nominated to stand for Parliament against Winston Churchill, when war was declared the election was cancelled.

Some sources say MacLaren's father founded the school, while others state it was Leon. According to the SES web site, MacLaren introduced and developed philosophy courses to complement his economics courses. Over time the philosophy courses became SES's principal area of teaching. According to the group's literature, from the mid-1960s onwards, MacLaren presented, in addition to some of the ideas of P. D. Ouspensky, the philosophy of Advaita Vedanta, a philosophical theology of absolute non-duality as taught by the eighth-century Indian philosopher-theologian Śaṅkara.

He later stood as the Liberal candidate for Yeovil at the 1950 election and then at Hendon South in 1951 without any success. According to the SES web site, MacLaren studied Advaita Vedanta philosophy in 1965 with Shantanand Saraswati the Shankaracharya of Jyotir Math. MacLaren attended a lecture by Maharishi Mahesh Yogi at the Albert Hall in London in 1959 and became a student of the Maharishi. On commentator states that in the 1950s, MacLaren met and was deeply inspired by an Indian guru, Sri Shantanand Saraswati, and henceforth the School of Economic Science's curriculum combined Platonic and Neoplatonic mysticism with Eastern Vedic philosophy. Meditation classes were taught alongside Socratic group dialogues.

According to Practical Philosophy's (founded by MacLaren) web site MacLaren spent three months in the early 1970s traveling around the world visiting the SES affiliated schools. MacLaren's illness came during his final world tour. He was brought back to England from South Africa and died in a London hospital on 24 June 1994. According to his foundation web site, MacLaren wrote a book called The Nature of Society. In 2009 MacLaren's former personal assistant, Dorine Tolley, published a biography of MacLaren called The Power Within: Leon MacLaren, A Memoir of His Life and Work.

In conjunction with Frances Roles, MacLaren founded the School of Meditation in London.

MacLaren was an enthusiast of the Sanskrit language, stating "The grammatical rules of Sanskrit are also the rules of creation". He began Sanskrit courses at the School of Economic Science. Today SES is the largest body of Sanskrit students in the UK.

MacLaren said on teamwork "The first quality of a leader of people – always the first quality – is a devotion to truth." and on praise "From praise comes joy, from joy – strength, from strength – virtue, from virtue – purity and from purity comes realization of one’s full potential."

Leon MacLaren is described as one of three men responsible for meditation being practised so widely in the west due to his early adoption of the practice and propagation of it globally via the School of Economic Science, the other two men being Maharishi Mahesh Yogi and Dr Francis C. Roles of The Study Society.)

He also established the St James Independent Schools, consisting of the St James Junior's, Senior Girls' and Senior Boys' School.

He taught until the last week of his life. In 1994, though ill, he flew from London to South Africa to lead a study week with the School's senior students. His visit was cut short when his health failed. He was flown back to London, where he died.

== Personal life ==
According to MacLaren's foundation web site he married twice, had two daughters and lived in Hammersmith and later Hampstead and Oxfordshire. MacLaren had two unsuccessful marriages, both with Study Society members. Neither woman ever joined the School of Economic Science, preferring to stay with Roles, even after MacLaren officially split from Roles and his group.

He had a keen interest in music, he played the saxophone in a jazz band in his early life and also played the piano. He also composed several pieces inducing: "In The Beginning", "Isha Upanishad" and "Rig Veda", based on a seven-tone scale described as the "natural octave", based on George Gurdjieff and P. D. Ouspensky's teachings.

== Published works ==
- Nature of Society (ISBN 9780956596819)
- Music: The Foundations of Harmony (ISBN 9780956596840)
- "Reminders": Extracts from the Lectures of Leon MacLaren (ISBN 9780956596802)
- The Science of Economics: The Economic Teaching of Leon MacLaren (ISBN 9780856832918)
