= History of Advaita Vedanta =

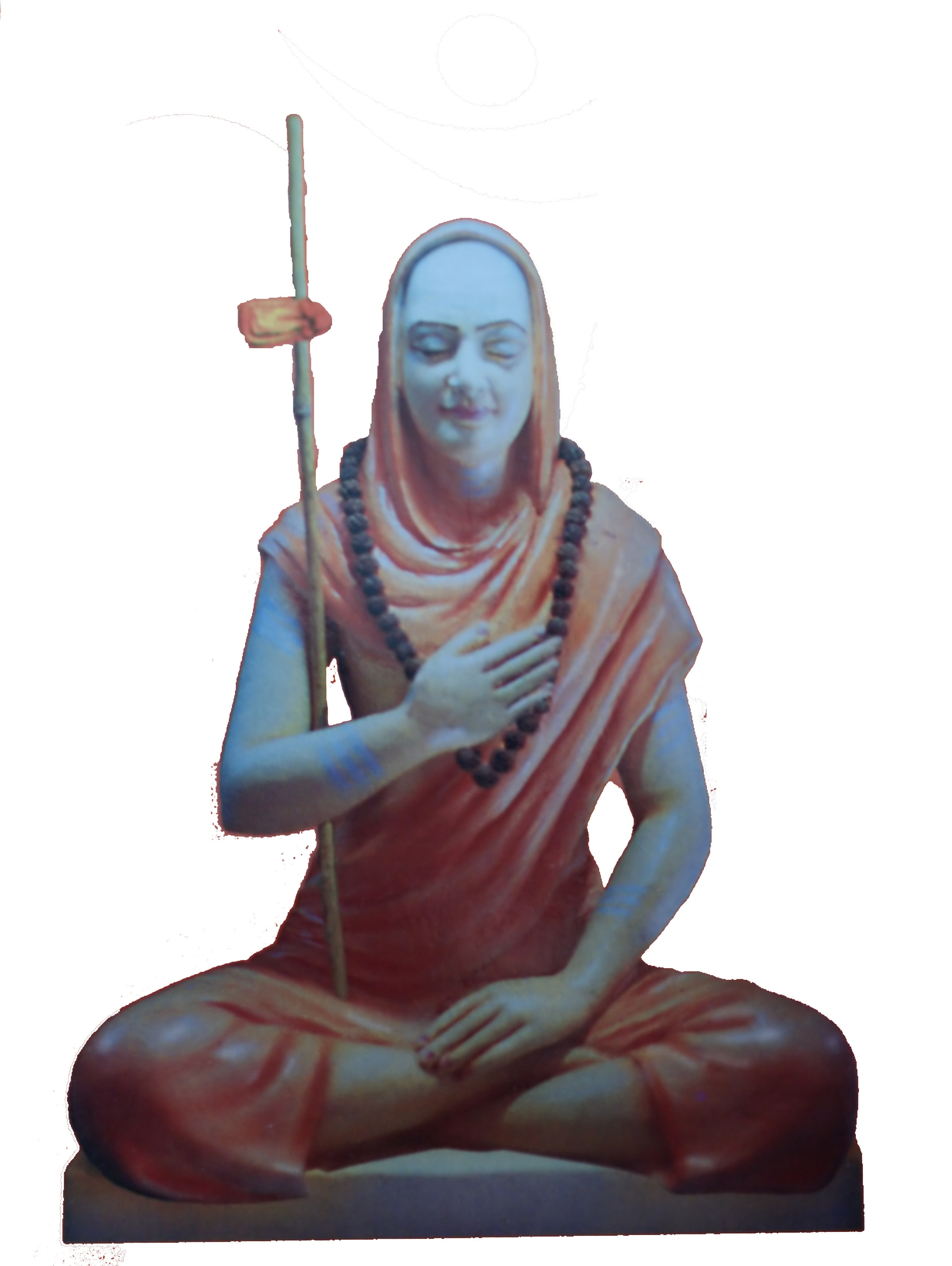
Gaudapada, one of the most important pre-Śaṅkara philosophers in Advaita tradition

Advaita Vedānta is the oldest extant tradition of Vedānta, and one of the six orthodox (āstika) Hindu philosophies (darśana). Its history may be traced back to the start of the Common Era, but takes clear shape in the 6th-7th century CE, with the seminal works of Gaudapada, Maṇḍana Miśra, and Shankara, who is considered by tradition and Orientalist Indologists to be the most prominent exponent of the Advaita Vedānta, (Note: Olivelle 1992, pp. x–xi, 8–10, 17–18; Phillips 1998, p. 332, note 68; Nakamura 1950, pp. 221, 680; Madaio 2017) though the historical fame and cultural influence of Shankara grew only centuries later, particularly during the era of the Muslim invasions and consequent reign of the Indian subcontinent. (Note: Hacker 1995, pp. 29–30; Blake Michael 1992, pp. 60–62 with notes 6, 7 and 8; King 2002, p. 128; Roodurmum 2002, pp. 33–34) The living Advaita Vedānta tradition in medieval times was influenced by, and incorporated elements from, the yogic tradition and texts like the Yoga Vasistha and the Bhagavata Purana. In the 19th century, due to the interplay between western views and Indian nationalism, Advaita came to be regarded as the paradigmatic example of Hindu spirituality, despite the numerical dominance of theistic Bkakti-oriented religiosity. In modern times, its views appear in various Neo-Vedānta movements.

== Historiography ==
The historiography of Advaita Vedanta is coloured by Orientalist notions, while modern formulations of Advaita Vedānta, which developed as a reaction to western Orientalism and Perennialism have "become a dominant force in Indian intellectual thought."

In the Orientalist view, the medieval Muslim period was a time of stagnation and cultural degeneration, in which the original purity of the Upanisadic teachings, systematized by philosophers like Shankara, was lost. In this view, "the genuine achievements of Indian civilization" were recovered during the British colonial rule of India, due to the efforts of western Indologists, who viewed Advaita Vedanta as the authentic philosophy of the Upanishads, and Shankara as its greatest exponent. (Note: See also Devdutt Pattanaik (August 30, 2020), Who is a Hindu? - What they don't tell you about Advaita, Mumbai Mirror.) While this view has been criticised by postcolonial studies and critiques of Orientalism, "in some corners of the academy, the Orientalists' understanding of premodern Indian history has so far escaped thorough reexamination." According to Michael S. Allen and Anand Venkatkrishnan, "scholars have yet to provide even a rudimentary, let alone comprehensive account of the history of Advaita Vedānta in the centuries leading up to the colonial period."

== Early Vedanta ==
The Upanishads form the basic texts, of which Vedānta gives an interpretation. The Upanishads do not contain "a rigorous philosophical inquiry identifying the doctrines and formulating the supporting arguments". (Note: Nevertheless, Balasubramanian argues that since the basic ideas of the Vedanta systems are derived from the Vedas, the Vedantic philosophy is as old as the Vedas.) This philosophical inquiry was performed by the darsanas, the various philosophical schools. (Note: Deutsch and Dalvi point out that, in the Indian context, texts "are only part of a tradition which is preserved in its purest form in the oral transmission as it has been going on".)

The Brahma Sutras of Bādarāyana, also called the Vedānta Sutra, were compiled in its present form around 400–450 AD, but "the great part of the Sutra must have been in existence much earlier than that". Estimates of the date of Bādarāyana's lifetime differ between 200 BC and 200 AD. The Brahma Sutra is a critical study of the teachings of the Upanishads, possibly "written from a Bhedābheda Vedāntic viewpoint." It was and is a guide-book for the great teachers of the Vedantic systems. Bādarāyana was not the first person to systematise the teachings of the Upanishads. He refers to seven Vedantic teachers before him:

From the way in which Bādarāyana cites the views of others it is obvious that the teachings of the Upanishads must have been analyzed and interpreted by quite a few before him and that his systematization of them in 555 sutras arranged in four chapters must have been the last attempt, most probably the best.

== Early Advaita Vedānta ==
Of the Vedānta-school before the composition of the Brahma Sutras (400–450 CE), wrote Nakamura in 1950, almost nothing is known. The two Advaita writings predating Maṇḍana Miśra and Shankara that were known to scholars such as Nakamura in the first half of 20th-century, were the Vākyapadīya, written by Bhartṛhari (second half 5th century,) and the Māndūkya-kārikā written by Gauḍapāda (7th century). Later scholarship added the Sannyasa Upanishads to the earliest known corpus.

According to Nakamura, "there must have been an enormous number of other writings turned out in this period [between the Brahma Sutras and Shankara], but unfortunately all of them have been scattered or lost and have not come down to us today". In his commentaries, Shankara mentions 99 different predecessors of his Sampradaya. In the beginning of his commentary on the Brhadaranyaka Upanishad Shankara salutes the teachers of the Brahmavidya Sampradaya. Pre-Shankara doctrines and sayings can be traced in the works of the later schools, which does give insight into the development of early Vedānta philosophy.

The names of various important early Vedānta thinkers have been listed in the Siddhitraya by Yamunācārya (c.1050), the Vedārthasamgraha by Rāmānuja (c.1050–1157), and the Yatīndramatadīpikā by Śrīnivāsa-dāsa. Combined, at least fourteen thinkers are known to have existed between the composition of the Brahman Sutras and Shankara's lifetime, namely Bhartŗhari (c.450–500), Upavarsa (c.450–500), Bodhāyana (c.500), Tanka (Brahmānandin) (c.500–550), Dravida (c.550), Bhartŗprapañca (c.550), Śabarasvāmin (c.550), Bhartŗmitra (c.550–600), Śrivatsānka (c.600), Sundarapāndya (c.600), Brahmadatta (c.600–700), Gaudapada (c.640–690), Govinda (c.670–720), Mandanamiśra (c.670–750).

=== Sannyasa Upanishads ===
Scholarship after 1950 suggests that almost all Sannyasa Upanishads, which belong to the minor Upanishads and are of a later date than the major Upanishads, namely the first centuries CE, (Note: According to Sprockhoff, the group of older Sannyasa Upanishads – Aruni, Kundika, Kathashruti, Paramahamsa, Jabala and Brahma – were composed before the 3rd-century CE, likely in the centuries before or after the start of the common era, while the Asrama Upanishad is dated to the 3rd-century. Olivelle disagrees with Sprockhoff, dating the group of oldest Sannyasa Upanishads to the first centuries of the common era.) and some of which are of a sectarian nature, have a strong Advaita Vedānta outlook. The Advaita Vedānta views in these ancient texts may be, states Patrick Olivelle, because major Hindu monasteries of this period (early medieval period, starting mid 6th century) belonged to the Advaita Vedānta tradition, preserving only Advaita views, and recasting other texts into Advaita texts.

=== Bhartṛhari ===
Bhartṛhari (Devanagari: भर्तृहरि; also romanised as Bhartrihari; fl. c. 5th century CE) is a Sanskrit writer to whom are normally ascribed two influential Sanskrit texts:

- the Vākyapadīya, on Sanskrit grammar and philosophy of language, a foundational text in the Indian grammatical tradition, explaining numerous theories on the word and on the sentence, including theories which came to be known under the name of Sphoṭa; in this work Bhartrhari also discussed logical problems such as the liar paradox and a paradox of unnameability or unsignifiability which has become known as Bhartrhari's paradox, and
- the Śatakatraya, a work of Sanskrit poetry, comprising three collections of about 100 stanzas each; it may or may not be by the same author who composed the two mentioned grammatical works.

=== Gauḍapāda and Māṇḍukya Kārikā ===
Gauḍapāda (6th century) was the teacher of Govinda Bhagavatpada and the grandteacher of Shankara. Gauḍapāda uses the concepts of Ajātivāda and Maya to establish "that from the level of ultimate truth the world is a cosmic illusion," and "suggests that the whole of our waking experience is exactly the same as an illusory and insubstantial dream." In contrast, Adi Shankara insists upon a distinction between waking experience and dreams.

==== Mandukya Karika ====
Gauḍapāda wrote or compiled the Māṇḍukya Kārikā, also known as the Gauḍapāda Kārikā or the Āgama Śāstra. The Māṇḍukya Kārikā is a commentary in verse form on the Māṇḍūkya Upanishad, one of the shortest Upanishads consisting of just 13 prose sentences. Of the ancient literature related to Advaita Vedānta, the oldest surviving complete text is the Māṇḍukya Kārikā. Many other texts with the same type of teachings and which were older than Māṇḍukya Kārikā existed and this is unquestionable because other scholars and their views are cited by Gauḍapāda, Shankara and Anandagiri, according to Hajime Nakamura. Gauḍapāda relied particularly on the Māṇḍūkya Upanishad, as well as the Brihadaranyaka and Chandogya Upanishads.

Gaudapada took over the Yogachara teaching of vijñapti-mātra, "representation-only," which states that the empirical reality that we experience is a fabrication of the mind, experienced by consciousness-an-sich, (Note: It is often used interchangeably with the term citta-mātra, but they have different meanings. The standard translation of both terms is "consciousness-only" or "mind-only." Several modern researchers object this translation, and the accompanying label of "absolute idealism" or "idealistic monism". A better translation for vijñapti-mātra is representation-only.) and the four-cornered negation, which negates any positive predicates of 'the Absolute'. (Note: 1. Something is. 2. It is not. 3. It both is and is not. 4. It neither is nor is not. The 'four-cornered negation' is an English gloss of the Sanskrit, Chatushkoti.) Gaudapada "wove [both doctrines] into the philosophy of Mandukaya Upanisad, which was further developed by Shankara". (Note: The influence of Mahayana Buddhism on other religions and philosophies was not limited to Vedanta. Kalupahana notes that the Visuddhimagga – a Theravada Buddhist tradition, contains "some metaphysical speculations, such as those of the Sarvastivadins, the Sautrantikas, and even the Yogacarins".) In this view,

the ultimate ontological reality is the pure consciousness, which is bereft of attributes and intentionality. The world of duality is nothing but a vibration of the mind (manodṛśya or manaspandita). The pluralistic world is imagined by the mind (saṁkalpa) and this false projection is sponsored by the illusory factor called māyā.

According to Bhattacharya, Asparsayoga also has Buddhist origins.

The Māṇḍūkya Upanishad was considered to be a Śruti before the era of Adi Shankara, but not treated as particularly important. In later post-Shankara period its value became far more important, and regarded as expressing the essence of the Upanishad philosophy. The entire Karika became a key text for the Advaita school in this later era. (Note: Nakamura notes that there are contradictions in doctrine between the four chapters. According to Murti, the conclusion from Mandukya Karika is so irresistible that Gaudapada is attempting an advaitic interpretation of Vedanta school of Hinduism in the light of the Madhyamika and Yogcara doctrines of Buddhism. However, adds Murti, the doctrines are unlike Buddhism. The first three chapters of the Karika are founded on the Upanishads, with little Buddhist flavor. Chapter Four is unlike the first three, and shows Buddhist terms and influence. Further, according to Murti, and Richard King, no Vedanta scholars who followed Gaudapada ever quoted from Chapter Four of Karika, they only quote from the first three.)

==== Shri Gauḍapādacharya Math ====
According to tradition, around 740 CE Gauḍapāda founded Shri Gauḍapādacharya Math (Note: Sanskrit: श्री संस्थान गौडपदाचार्य मठ, Śrī Sansthāna Gauḍapadācārya Maṭha), also known as Kavaḷē maṭha. It is located in Kavale, Ponda, Goa, and is the oldest matha of the South Indian Saraswat Brahmins.

== Early medieval period - Maṇḍana Miśra and Adi Shankara ==
While today Shankara is regarded as the greatest exponent of Advaita Vedanta, until the 10th century his older contemporary Maṇḍana Miśra was the most prominent Advaitin. Shankara gained more attention in the 10th century, due to the writings of Vachaspati Misra (800–900 CE), a student of Maṇḍana Miśra, but it was not until the 14th century that Shankara was promoted as a folk-hero who disseminated Advaita Vedanta throughout India.

=== Historical context ===
Maṇḍana Miśra and Shankara lived in the time of the so-called "Late classical Hinduism", which lasted from 650 to 1100 . This era was one of political instability that followed Gupta dynasty and King Harsha of the 7th century . It was a time of social and cultural change as the ideas of Buddhism, Jainism, and various traditions within Hinduism were competing for members. Buddhism in particular influenced India's spiritual traditions in the first 700 years of the 1st millennium AD. Shankara and his contemporaries made a significant contribution in understanding Buddhism and the ancient Vedic traditions; they then incorporated the extant ideas, particularly reforming the Vedānta tradition of Hinduism, making it India's most important tradition for more than a thousand years.

=== Maṇḍana Miśra ===
Maṇḍana Miśra was an older contemporary of Shankara. Maṇḍana Miśra was a Mimamsa scholar and a follower of Kumarila, but also wrote a seminal text on Advaita that has survived into the modern era, the Brahma-siddhi. His influence was such that some regard the Brahma-siddhi to have "set forth a non-Shankaran brand of Advaita," and for a couple of centuries he seems to have been regarded as "the most important representative of the Advaita position." The "theory of error" set forth in this work became the normative Advaita Vedānta theory of error. According to Maṇḍana Miśra, errors are opportunities because they "lead to truth", and full correct knowledge requires that not only should one understand the truth but also examine and understand errors as well as what is not truth.

Maṇḍana Miśra's influence is reflected in a tradition which tells Maṇḍana Miśra and his wife were defeated by Shankara in a debate, after which he became a follower of Shankara. Yet, his attitude toward Shankara was that of a "self-confident rival teacher of Advaita," and the legend may have intended to incorporate Maṇḍana Miśra into Shankara's fold.

=== Adi Shankara ===
20th verse of Brahmajnanavalimala, attributed to Adi Shankara:
ब्रह्म सत्यं जगन्मिथ्या
जीवो ब्रह्मैव नापरः

Brahman is real, the world is an illusion
Brahman and Jiva are not different.

Brahmajnanavalimala 1.20

Advaita Vedānta existed prior to Adi Shankara (788–820), also known as Śaṅkara Bhagavatpādācārya and Ādi Śaṅkarācārya, but found in him its most influential expounder.

==== Systematizer of Advaita Vedanta thought ====
According to Nakamura, comparison of the known teachings of the early Vedantins and Shankara's thought shows that most of the characteristics of Shankara's thought "were advocated by someone before Śankara". Shankara "was the person who synthesized the Advaita-vāda which had previously existed before him". In this synthesis, he was the rejuvenator and defender of ancient learning. He was an unequalled commentator, due to whose efforts and contributions the Advaita Vedānta assumed a dominant position within Indian philosophy.

According to Mayeda, Shankara represents a turning point in the development of Vedānta, yet he also notices that it is only since Deussens's praise that Shankara "has usually been regarded as the greatest philosopher of India." Mayeda further notes that Shankara was primarily concerned with moksha, "and not with the establishment of a complete system of philosophy or theology," following Potter, who qualifies Shankara as a "speculative philosopher." According to Nakamura, after the growing influence of Buddhism on Vedānta, culminating in the works of Gauḍapāda, Adi Shankara gave a Vedantic character to the Buddhistic elements in these works, synthesising and rejuvenating the doctrine of Advaita. According to Koller, using ideas in ancient Indian texts, Shankara systematized the foundation for Advaita Vedānta in the 8th century, reforming Badarayana's Vedānta tradition.

==== Writings ====
Adi Shankara is best known for his reviews and commentaries (Bhasyas) on ancient Indian texts. Shankara's masterpiece of commentary is the Brahmasutrabhasya (literally, commentary on Brahma Sutra), a fundamental text of the Vedānta school of Hinduism. His commentaries on ten Mukhya (principal) Upanishads are also considered authentic by scholars. Other authentic works of Shankara include commentaries on the Bhagavad Gitā (part of his Prasthana Trayi Bhasya).

Shankara's Vivarana (tertiary notes) on the commentary by Vedavyasa on Yogasutras as well as those on Apastamba Dharma-sũtras (Adhyatama-patala-bhasya) are accepted by scholars as authentic works of Adi Shankara. Among the Stotra (poetic works), the Daksinamurti Stotra, Bhajagovinda Stotra, Sivanandalahari, Carpata-panjarika, Visnu-satpadi, Harimide, Dasa-shloki, and Krishna-staka are likely to be authentic. He also authored Upadesasahasri, his most important original philosophical work. Of other original Prakaranas (प्रकरण, monographs, treatise), 76 works are attributed to Adi Shankara. Modern era Indian scholars Belvalkar and Upadhyaya accept five and thirty nine works, respectively, as authentic.

Several commentaries on Nrisimha-Purvatatapaniya and Shveshvatara Upanishads have been attributed to Adi Shankara, but their authenticity is highly doubtful. Similarly, commentaries on several early and later Upanishads attributed to Shankara are rejected by scholars as his works, and are likely works of later Advaita Vedānta scholars; these include the Kaushitaki Upanishad, Maitri Upanishad, Kaivalya Upanishad, Paramahamsa Upanishad, Sakatayana Upanishad, Mandala Brahmana Upanishad, Maha Narayana Upanishad, and Gopalatapaniya Upanishad.

The authenticity of Shankara being the author of Vivekacūḍāmaṇi has been questioned, and "modern scholars tend to reject its authenticity as a work by Shankara." The authorship of Shankara of his Mandukya Upanishad Bhasya and his supplementary commentary on Gaudapada's Māṇḍukya Kārikā has been disputed by Nakamura. However, other scholars state that the commentary on Mandukya, which is actually a commentary on Madukya-Karikas by Gaudapada, may be authentic.

==== Influence of Shankara ====
Shankara's status in the tradition of Advaita Vedānta is unparallelled. According to his hagiographies, written in te 14th-17th century and which shaped the popular reception of Shankara, he travelled all over India to help restore the study of the Vedas. His teachings and the tradition attributed to him form the basis of Smartism and have influenced Sant Mat lineages. He's further believed to have introduced the Pañcāyatana form of worship, the simultaneous worship of five deities – Ganesha, Surya, Vishnu, Shiva, and Devi. Shankara explained that all deities were but different forms of the one Brahman, the invisible Supreme Being.

Benedict Ashley credits Adi Shankara for unifying two seemingly disparate philosophical doctrines in Hinduism, namely Atman and Brahman. Isaeva states that Shankara's influence extended to reforming Hinduism, founding monasteries, edifying disciples, disputing opponents, and engaging in philosophic activity that, in the eyes of Indian tradition, helped revive "the orthodox idea of the unity of all beings" and Vedānta thought.

Scholars have questioned Shankara's early influence in India. The historical records for this period are unclear, and little reliable information is known about the various contemporaries and disciples of Shankara. According to King and Roodurmum, until the 10th century Shankara was overshadowed by his older contemporary Mandana-Misra, who was considered to be the major representative of Advaita. Some modern Advaitins argue that most of post-Shankara Advaita vedanta actually deviates from Shankara, and that only his student Suresvara, who's had little influence, represents Shankara correctly. In this view, Shankara's influential student Padmapada misunderstood Shankara, while his views were maintained by the Suresvara school. According to Satchidanandendra Sarasvati, "almost all the later Advaitins were influenced by Mandana Misra and Bhaskara." (Note: Potter (2006, pp. 6–7): "...these modern interpreters are implying that most Advaitins after Samkara's time are confused and basically mistaken, and that 99% of the extant classical interpretive literature on Samkara's philosophy is off the mark. This is clearly a remarkably radical conclusion. Yet, there is good reason to think that it may well be true.)

Until the 11th century, Vedanta itself was a peripheral school of thought; Vedanta became a major influence when Vedanta philosophy was utilized by various sects of Hinduism to ground their doctrines, such as Ramanuja (11th c.), who aligned bhakti, "the major force in the religions of Hinduism," with philosophical thought, meanwhile rejecting Shankara's views. (Note: Encyclopedia Britannica, Ramanajua)

Several scholars argue that the historical fame and cultural influence of Shankara grew centuries later, particularly during the era of the Muslim invasions and consequent devastation of India. Many of Shankara's biographies were created and published in and after the 14th century, such as the widely cited Vidyaranya's Śankara-vijaya. Vidyaranya, also known as Madhava, who was the 12th Jagadguru of the Śringeri Śarada Pītham from 1380 to 1386, inspired the re-creation of the Hindu Vijayanagara Empire of South India in response to the devastation caused by the Islamic Delhi Sultanate. He and his brothers, suggest Paul Hacker and other scholars, wrote about Śankara as well as extensive Advaitic commentaries on the Vedas and Dharma. Vidyaranya was a minister in the Vijayanagara Empire and enjoyed royal support, and his sponsorship and methodical efforts helped establish Shankara as a rallying symbol of values, spread historical and cultural influence of Shankara's Vedānta philosophies, and establish monasteries (mathas) to expand the cultural influence of Shankara and Advaita Vedānta.

=== Advaita Vedānta sub-schools ===
After Maṇḍana Miśra and Shankara, several sub-schools developed. Two of them still exist today, the Bhāmatī and the Vivarana. Two defunct schools are the Pancapadika and Istasiddhi, which were replaced by Prakasatman's Vivarana school. These schools worked out the logical implications of various Advaita doctrines. Two of the problems they encountered were the further interpretations of the concepts of māyā and avidya.

==== Sureśvara ====
Sureśvara (fl. 800–900 CE) was a contemporary of Shankara. Sureśvara has been credited as the founder of a pre-Shankara branch of Advaita Vedānta, and is often (incorrectly) being identified with Maṇḍana Miśra. The identification is unlikely, and may reflect the influence of Mandana Misra. Hiriyanna and Kuppuswami Sastra have pointed out that Sureśvara and Maṇḍana Miśra had different views on various doctrinal points:

- The locus of avidya: according to Maṇḍana Miśra, the individual jiva is the locus of avidya, whereas Suresvara contends that the avidya regarding Brahman is located in Brahman. These two different stances are also reflected in the opposing positions of the Bhamati school and the Vivarana school.
- Liberation: according to Maṇḍana Miśra, the knowledge that arises from the Mahavakya is insufficient for liberation. Only the direct realization of Brahma is liberating, which can only be attained by meditation. According to Suresvara, this knowledge is directly liberating, while meditation is at best a useful aid. (Note: According to both Roodurum and Isaeva, Sureśvara stated that mere knowledge of the identity of Jiva and Brahman is not enough for liberation, which requires prolonged meditation on this identity.)

==== Padmapada – Pancapadika school ====
Padmapada (c. 800 CE) was a direct disciple of Shankara who wrote the Pancapadika, a commentary on the Sankara-bhaya. Padmapada diverged from Shankara in his description of avidya, designating prakrti as avidya or ajnana.

==== Vachaspati Misra – Bhamati school ====
Vachaspati Misra (800–900 CE), a student of Maṇḍana Miśra, wrote the Brahmatattva-samiksa, a commentary on Maṇḍana Miśra's Brahma-siddhi, wrote the Bhamati, a commentary on Shankara's Brahma Sutra Bhashya, and the Brahmatattva-samiksa, a commentary on Mandana Mishra's Brahma-siddhi. His thought was mainly inspired by Mandana Miśra, and harmonises Shankara's thought with that of Mandana Miśra. According to Advaita tradition, Shankara reincarnated as Vachaspati Miśra "to popularise the Advaita System through his Bhamati." Only two works are known of Vachaspati Misra, the Brahmatattva-samiksa on Maṇḍana Miśra's Brahma-siddhi, and his Bhamati on the Sankara-bhasya, Shankara's commentary on the Brahma-sutras. The name of the Bhamati sub-school is derived from this Bhamati.

The Bhamati school takes an ontological approach. It sees the Jiva as the source of avidya. It sees meditation as the main factor in the acquirement of liberation, while the study of the Vedas and reflection are additional factors.

==== Vimuktatman – Ista-Siddhi ====
Vimuktatman (c. 1200 CE) wrote the Ista-siddhi. It is one of the four traditional siddhi, together with Mandana's Brahma-siddhi, Suresvara's Naiskarmya-siddhi, and Madusudana's Advaita-siddhi. According to Vimuktatman, absolute Reality is "pure intuitive consciousness". His school of thought was eventually replaced by Prakasatman's Vivarana school.

==== Prakasatman – Vivarana school ====
Prakasatman (c. 1200–1300) wrote the Pancapadika-Vivarana, a commentary on the Pancapadika by Padmapadacharya. The Vivarana lends its name to the subsequent school. According to Roodurmum, "[H]is line of thought [...] became the leitmotif of all subsequent developments in the evolution of the Advaita tradition."

The Vivarana school takes an epistemological approach. Prakasatman was the first to propound the theory of mulavidya or maya as being of "positive beginningless nature", and sees Brahman as the source of avidya. Critics object that Brahman is pure consciousness, so it cannot be the source of avidya. Another problem is that contradictory qualities, namely knowledge and ignorance, are attributed to Brahman.

== Late medieval times – "yogic Advaita" and "Greater Advaita Vedānta" ==
Michael S. Allen and Anand Venkatkrishnan note that Shankara is very well-studied, but "scholars have yet to provide even a rudimentary, let alone comprehensive account of the history of Advaita Vedānta in the centuries leading up to the colonial period."

=== Prominent teachers ===
According to Sangeetha Menon, prominent names in the later Advaita tradition are:

- Prakāsātman, Vimuktātman, Sarvajñātman (10th century)(see above)
- Śrī Harṣa, Citsukha (12th century)
- ānandagiri, Amalānandā (13th century)
- Vidyāraņya, Śaṅkarānandā (14th century)
- Sadānandā (15th century)
- Prakāśānanda, Nṛsiṁhāśrama (16th century)
- Madhusūdhana Sarasvati, Dharmarāja Advarindra, Appaya Dīkśita (17th century)

=== Vaishnavite Vedanta (10th-14th century) ===
Hajime Nakamura notes that the early Vedanta scholars were from the upper classes of society, well-educated in traditional culture. They formed a social elite, "sharply distinguished from the general practitioners and theologians of Hinduism." Their teachings were "transmitted among a small number of selected intellectuals". Works of the early Vedanta schools do not contain references to Vishnu or Shiva. It was only after Shankara that "the theologians of the various sects of Hinduism utilized Vedanta philosophy to a greater or lesser degree to form the basis of their doctrines," whereby "its theoretical influence upon the whole of Indian society became final and definitive."

=== Influence of yogic tradition ===
While indologists like Paul Hacker and Wilhelm Halbfass took Shankara's system as the measure for an "orthodox" Advaita Vedānta, the living Advaita Vedānta tradition in medieval times was influenced by, and incorporated elements from, the yogic tradition and texts like the Yoga Vasistha and the Bhagavata Purana. The Yoga Vasistha became an authoritative source text in the Advaita vedānta tradition in the 14th century, while the "yogic Advaita" of Vidyāraņya's Jivanmuktiviveka (14th century) was influenced by the (Laghu-)Yoga-Vasistha, which in turn was influenced by Kashmir Shaivism. Vivekananda's 19th century emphasis on nirvikalpa samadhi was preceded by medieval yogic influences on Advaita Vedānta. In the 16th and 17th centuries, some Nath and hatha yoga texts also came within the scope of the developing Advaita Vedānta tradition.

=== Development of central position (14th century) ===
In medieval times, Advaita Vedanta position as most influential Hindu darsana started to take shape, as Advaitins in the Vijayanagara Empire competed for patronage from the royal court, and tried to convert others to their sect. It is only during this period that the historical fame and cultural influence of Shankara and Advaita Vedanta was established. Many of Shankara's biographies were created and published in and after the 14th century, such as Vidyaranya's widely cited Śankara-vijaya. Vidyaranya, also known as Madhava, who was the 12th Jagadguru of the Śringeri Śarada Pītham from 1380 to 1386 and a minister in the Vijayanagara Empire, inspired the re-creation of the Hindu Vijayanagara Empire of South India. This may have been in response to the devastation caused by the Islamic Delhi Sultanate, but his efforts were also targeted at Srivaisnava groups, especially Visistadvaita, which was dominant in territories conquered by the Vijayanagara Empire. Furthermore, sects competed for patronage from the royal court, and tried to convert others to their own sectarian system. Vidyaranya and his brothers, note Paul Hacker and other scholars, wrote extensive Advaitic commentaries on the Vedas and Dharma to make "the authoritative literature of the Aryan religion" more accessible. Vidyaranya was an influential Advaitin, and he created legends to turn Shankara, whose elevated philosophy had no appeal to gain widespread popularity, into a "divine folk-hero who spread his teaching through his digvijaya ("universal conquest") all over India like a victorious conqueror." In his doxography Sarvadarśanasaṅgraha ("Summary of all views") Vidyaranya presented Shankara's teachings as the summit of all darsanas, presenting the other darsanas as partial truths which converged in Shankara's teachings, which was regarded to be the most inclusive system. The Vaishanava traditions of Dvaita and Visitadvaita were not classified as Vedanta, and placed just above Buddhism and Jainism, reflecting the threat they posed for Vidyaranya's Advaita allegiance. Bhedabheda wasn't mentioned at all, "literally written out of the history of Indian philosophy." Such was the influence of the Sarvadarśanasaṅgraha, that early Indologists also regarded Advaita Vedanta as the most accurate interpretation of the Upanishads. And Vidyaranya founded a matha, proclaiming that it was established by Shankara himself. Vidyaranya enjoyed royal support, and his sponsorship and methodical efforts helped establish Shankara as a rallying symbol of values, spread historical and cultural influence of Shankara's Vedānta philosophies, and establish monasteries (mathas) to expand the cultural influence of Shankara and Advaita Vedānta.

It is with the arrival of Islamic rule, first in the form of Delhi Sultanate and later the Mughal Empire, and the subsequent persecution of Indian religions, that Hindu scholars began a self-conscious attempts to define an identity and unity. Between the twelfth and the fourteenth century, according to Andrew Nicholson, this effort emerged with a classification of astika and nastika systems of Indian philosophies. Certain thinkers, according to Nicholson, began to retrospectively classify ancient thought into "six systems" (saddarsana) of mainstream Hindu philosophy.

Traditional Hindus present an alternate thesis. The scriptures such as the Vedas, Upanishads and Bhagavad Gitā, texts such as Dharmasutras and Puranas, and various ideas that are considered to be paradigmatic Hinduism are traceable to being thousands of years old. Unlike Christianity and Islam, Hinduism as a religion does not have a single founder, rather it is a fusion of diverse scholarship where a galaxy of thinkers openly challenged each other's teachings and offered their own ideas. The term "Hindu," states Arvind Sharma, appears in much older texts such as those in Arabic that record the Islamic invasion or regional rule of the Indian subcontinent. Some of these texts have been dated to between the 8th and the 11th century.

== Modern times (colonial rule and independence) ==
=== Neo-Vedanta ===
King states that its present position was a response of Hindu intellectuals to centuries of Christian polemic aimed at establishing a "Hindu inferiority complex" during the colonial rule of the Indian subcontinent. The "humanistic, inclusivist" formulation, now called Neo-Vedānta, attempted to respond to this colonial stereotyping of "Indian culture was backward, superstitious and inferior to the West", states King. Advaita Vedānta was projected as the central philosophy of Hinduism, and Neo-Vedānta subsumed and incorporated Buddhist ideas thereby making the Buddha a part of the Vedānta tradition, all in an attempt to reposition the history of Indian culture. Thus, states King, neo-Vedānta developed as a reaction to western Orientalism and Perennialism. With the efforts of Vivekananda, modern formulations of Advaita Vedānta have "become a dominant force in Indian intellectual thought", though Hindu beliefs and practices are diverse.

According to King, with the consolidation of the British imperialist rule the new rulers started to view Indians through the "colonially crafted lenses" of Orientalism. In response Hindu nationalism emerged, striving for socio-political independence and countering the influence of Christian missionaries. In this colonial era search of identity Vedānta came to be regarded, both by westerners as by Indian nationalists, as the essence of Hinduism, and Advaita Vedānta came to be regarded as "then paradigmatic example of the mystical nature of the Hindu religion" and umbrella of "inclusivism". This view on Advaita Vedānta, according to King, "provided an opportunity for the construction of a nationalist ideology that could unite Hindus in their struggle against colonial oppression".

Among the colonial era intelligentsia, according to Anshuman Mondal, a professor of Literature specializing in post-colonial studies, the monistic Advaita Vedānta has been a major ideological force for Hindu nationalism. Mahatma Gandhi professed monism of Advaita Vedānta, though at times he also spoke with terms from mind-body dualism schools of Hinduism. Other colonial era Indian thinkers, such as Vivekananda, presented Advaita Vedānta as an inclusive universal religion, a spirituality that in part helped organize a religiously infused identity, and the rise of Hindu nationalism as a counter weight to Islam-infused Muslim communitarian organizations such as the Muslim League, to Christianity-infused colonial orientalism and to religious persecution of those belonging to Indian religions.

==== Swami Vivekananda ====
A major proponent in the popularisation of this Universalist and Perennialist interpretation of Advaita Vedānta was Swami Vivekananda, who played a major role in the revival of Hinduism, and the spread of Advaita Vedānta to the west via the Ramakrishna Mission. His interpretation of Advaita Vedānta has been called "Neo-Vedānta". Vivekananda discerned a universal religion, regarding all the apparent differences between various traditions as various manifestations of one truth. He presented karma, bhakti, jnana and raja yoga as equal means to attain moksha, to present Vedānta as a liberal and universal religion, in contrast to the exclusivism of other religions.

Vivekananda emphasised nirvikalpa samadhi as the spiritual goal of Vedānta, he equated it to the liberation in Yoga and encouraged Yoga practice he called Raja yoga. This approach, however, is missing in historic Advaita texts. In 1896, Vivekananda claimed that Advaita appeals to modern scientists:

I may make bold to say that the only religion which agrees with, and even goes a little further than modern researchers, both on physical and moral lines is the Advaita, and that is why it appeals to modern scientists so much. They find that the old dualistic theories are not enough for them, do not satisfy their necessities. A man must have not only faith, but intellectual faith too". (Note: s:The Complete Works of Swami Vivekananda/Volume 2/Jnana-Yoga/The Absolute and Manifestation)

According to Rambachan, Vivekananda interprets anubhava as to mean "personal experience", akin to religious experience, whereas Shankara used the term to denote liberating understanding of the sruti.

Vivekananda's claims about spirituality as "science" and modern, according to David Miller, may be questioned by well informed scientists, but it drew attention for being very different than how Christianity and Islam were being viewed by scientists and sociologists of his era.

==== Sarvepalli Radhakrishnan ====
Sarvepalli Radhakrishnan, first a professor at Oxford University and later a President of India, further popularized Advaita Vedānta, presenting it as the essence of Hinduism. According to Michael Hawley, a professor of Religious Studies, Radhakrishnan saw other religions, as well as "what Radhakrishnan understands as lower forms of Hinduism," as interpretations of Advaita Vedānta, thereby "in a sense Hindusizing all religions". To him, the world faces a religious problem, where there is unreflective dogmatism and exclusivism, creating a need for "experiential religion" and "inclusivism". Advaita Vedānta, claimed Radhakrishnan, best exemplifies a Hindu philosophical, theological, and literary tradition that fulfills this need. Radhakrishnan did not emphasize the differences between Buddhism, Jainism, Sikhism versus Hinduism that he defined in terms of Advaita Vedānta, rather he tended to minimize their differences. This is apparent, for example, in his discussions of Buddhist "Madhyamika and Yogacara" traditions versus the Advaita Vedānta tradition.

Radhakrishnan metaphysics was grounded in Advaita Vedānta, but he reinterpreted Advaita Vedānta for contemporary needs and context. He acknowledged the reality and diversity of the world of experience, which he saw as grounded in and supported by the transcendent metaphysical absolute concept (nirguna Brahman). (Note: Neo-Vedanta seems to be closer to Bhedabheda-Vedanta than to Shankara's Advaita Vedanta, with the acknowledgement of the reality of the world. Nicholas F. Gier: "Ramakrsna, Svami Vivekananda, and Aurobindo (I also include M.K. Gandhi) have been labeled "neo-Vedantists," a philosophy that rejects the Advaitins' claim that the world is illusory. Aurobindo, in his The Life Divine, declares that he has moved from Sankara's "universal illusionism" to his own "universal realism" (2005: 432), defined as metaphysical realism in the European philosophical sense of the term.") Radhakrishnan also reinterpreted Shankara's notion of maya. According to Radhakrishnan, maya is not a strict absolute idealism, but "a subjective misperception of the world as ultimately real."

==== Mahatama Gandhi ====
Gandhi declared his allegiance to Advaita Vedānta, and was another popularizing force for its ideas. According to Nicholas Gier, this to Gandhi meant the unity of God and humans, that all beings have the same one Self and therefore equality, that atman exists and is same as everything in the universe, ahimsa (non-violence) is the very nature of this atman. Gandhi called himself advaitist many times, including his letters, but he believed that others have a right to a viewpoint different than his own because they come from a different background and perspective. According to Gier, Gandhi did not interpret maya as illusion, but accepted that "personal theism" leading to "impersonal monism" as two tiers of religiosity.

== Contemporary Advaita Vedānta ==
Contemporary teachers are the orthodox Jagadguru of Sringeri Sharada Peetham; the more traditional teachers Sivananda Saraswati (1887–1963), Chinmayananda Saraswati (1916-1993), Dayananda Saraswati (Arsha Vidya) (1930-2015), Swami Paramarthananda, Swami Tattvavidananda Sarasvati, Carol Whitfield (Radha), Sri Vasudevacharya (previously Michael Comans) and less traditional teachers such as Narayana Guru. According to Sangeetha Menon, prominent names in 20th century Advaita tradition are Shri Chandrashekhara Bharati Mahaswami, Chandrasekharendra Saraswati Swamigal, Sacchidānandendra Saraswati.

== See also ==
- Buddhist influences on Advaita Vedanta
- History of India
- History of Hinduism
- History of Buddhism
- Neo-Advaita
- Nondualism

== Sources ==
Printed sources

- Allen, Michael S. (2 October 2017). "Greater Advaita Vedānta: The Case of Niścaldās". International Journal of Hindu Studies. 21 (3): 275–297. doi:10.1007/s11407-017-9214-0. S2CID 171944554.
- Allen, Michael S.; Venkatkrishnan, Anand (25 September 2017). "Introduction to Special Issue: New Directions in the Study of Advaita Vedānta". International Journal of Hindu Studies. 21 (3): 271–274. doi:10.1007/s11407-017-9218-9.
- Baird, Robert D. (1986), "Swami Bhativedanta and the Bhagavd Gita As It Is", in Minor, Robert Neil (ed.), Modern Indian Interpreters of the Bhagavad Gita, SUNY Press
- Balasubramanian, R. (2000). "Introduction". In Chattopadhyana (ed.). History of Science, Philosophy and Culture in Indian Civilization. Volume II Part 2: Advaita Vedanta. Delhi: Centre for Studies in Civilizations.
- Bhatawadekar, Sai (2013), "The Tvat Tam Asi Formula and Schopenhauer's "Deductive Leap"", in Fuechtner, Veronika; Rhiel, Mary (eds.), Imagining Germany Imagining Asia: Essays in Asian-German Studies, Boydell & Brewer
- Bhattacharya, Vidhushekhara (1943). Gauḍapādakārikā. Delhi: Motilal Banarsidass.
- Biderman, Shlomo (1978). "Śankara and the Buddhists". Journal of Indian Philosophy. 6 (4). doi:10.1007/BF00218430. S2CID 170754201.
- Black, Brian (2012), The Character of the Self in Ancient India: Priests, Kings, and Women in the Early Upanisads, SUNY, ISBN 9780791480526, archived from the original on 2022-01-05
- Blake Michael, R. (1992), The Origins of Vīraśaiva Sects, Motilal Banarsidass, ISBN 978-81-208-0776-1
- Bowker, John (2000), "Advaita Vedanta", The Concise Oxford Dictionary of World Religions, Oxford University Press, archived from the original on 2022-01-05
- Bowker, John (2003), "Brahman", The Oxford Dictionary of World Religions, Oxford University Press, ISBN 978-0-19-280094-7, archived from the original on 2022-01-04
- Brannigan, Michael (2009), Striking a Balance: A Primer in Traditional Asian Values, Rowman & Littlefield, Rowman & Littlefield, ISBN 978-0739138465
- Braue, Donald A. (1984), Māyā in Radhakrishnanʾs Thought: Six Meanings Other Than Illusion, Motilall Banarsidass
- Brereton, Joel P. (1986), ""Tat Tvam Ast" in Context", Zeitschrift der Deutschen Morgenländischen Gesellschaft, 136 (1): 98–109
- Brodd, Jeffrey (2003). World Religions. Winona, MN: Saint Mary's Press. ISBN 978-0-88489-725-5.
- Brodd, Jeffrey (2009), World Religions: A Voyage of Discovery, Saint Mary's Press, ISBN 978-0884899976
- Brooks, Douglas Renfrew (1990). The Secret of the Three Cities: An Introduction to Hindu Shakta Tantrism. Chicago: The University of Chicago Press. ISBN 978-0-226-07569-3.
- Brown, C. Mackenzie (1983). "The Origin and Transmission of the Two "Bhāgavata Purāṇas": A Canonical and Theological Dilemma". Journal of the American Academy of Religion. 51 (4). Oxford University Press: 551–567. doi:10.1093/jaarel/li.4.551. JSTOR 1462581.
- Caplan, Mariana (2009), Eyes Wide Open: Cultivating Discernment on the Spiritual Path, Sounds True
- Chapple, Christopher (1984). "Introduction". The Concise Yoga Vāsiṣṭha. Translated by S Venkatesananda. State University of New York Press. ISBN 0-87395-955-8. OCLC 11044869. Archived from the original on 2019-12-23.
- Chatterjea, Tara (2003), Knowledge and Freedom in Indian Philosophy, Lexington Books
- Comans, Michael (2000), The Method of Early Advaita Vedānta: A Study of Gauḍapāda, Śaṅkara, Sureśvara, and Padmapāda, Delhi: Motilal Banarsidass
- Dalal, Neil (2009). "Contemplative Practice and Textual Agency in Advaita Vedanta". Method and Theory in the Study of Religion. 21: 15–27. doi:10.1163/157006809X416788.
- Dalal, Neil (2014). "Contemplative Grammars: Śaṅkara's Distinction of Upāsana and Nididhyāsana". Journal of Indian Philosophy. 44: 179–206. doi:10.1007/s10781-014-9258-z. S2CID 170638191.
- Dandekar, R.N. (2005), "Vedanta", in Jones, Lindsay (ed.), MacMillan Encyclopedia of Religion, MacMillan
- Dasgupta, Surendranath (1955), A history of Indian philosophy. 5. Southern schools of ́Saivism, Volume 5, CUP Archive
- Dasgupta, Surendranath (1975), A history of Indian philosophy. Volume 2, Motilal Banarsidass Publ.
- Dasgupta, S.N. (1997). History of Indian Philosophy, Volume 1.
- Dasgupta, Sanghamitra; Mohanta, Dilip Kumar (1998), Indian Philosophical Quarterly, vol. XXV
- Datta, D.M. (1992) [1932], The Six Ways of Knowing: A Critical study of the Advaita theory of knowledge, University of Calcutta, Motilal Banarsidass Publishers Private Limited, pp. 221–253, ISBN 978-8120835269
- Davis, Leesa S. (2010), Advaita Vedānta and Zen Buddhism: Deconstructive Modes of Spiritual Inquiry, Continuum International Publishing Group
- Davis, Richard (2014), Ritual in an Oscillating Universe: Worshipping Siva in Medieval India, Princeton University Press, ISBN 978-0691603087
- Dense, Christian D. Von (1999), Philosophers and Religious Leaders, Greenwood Publishing Group
- Deussen, Paul (1980). Sixty Upaniṣads of the Veda, Volume 1. Motilal Banarsidass.
- Deutsch, Eliot (1973), Advaita Vedanta: A Philosophical Reconstruction, University of Hawaii Press, ISBN 978-0-8248-0271-4, archived from the original on 2021-11-21
- Deutsch, Eliot (1988), Advaita Vedanta: A Philosophical Reconstruction, University of Hawaii Press, ISBN 0-88706-662-3
- Deutsch, Eliot; Dalvi, Rohit (2004), The Essential Vedanta: A New Source Book of Advaita Vedanta, World Wisdom, Inc., ISBN 9780941532525, archived from the original on 2022-01-04
- Doniger, Wendy (1999), Merriam-Webster's Encyclopedia of World Religions, Merriam-Webster, ISBN 9780877790440, archived from the original on 2014-12-31
- Dyczkowski, Mark (1989), The Canon of the Śaivāgama, Motilal Banarsidass Pvt. Ltd., ISBN 978-8120805958
- Fasching, Wolfgang (2011), "'I Am of the Nature of Seeing': Phenomenological Reflections on the Indian Notion of Witness-Consciousness", in Siderits, M.; Thompson, E.; Zahavi, D. (eds.), Self, No Self? Perspectives from Analytical, Phenomenological, and Indian Traditions, Oxford: Oxford University Press
- Fasching, Wolfgang (2021), "Prakāśa. A few reflections on the Advaitic understanding of consciousness as presence and its relevance for philosophy of mind", Phenomenology and the Cognitive Sciences, 20 (4), Springer: 679–701, doi:10.1007/s11097-020-09690-2, S2CID 225385862
- Flood, Gavin (1996), An Introduction to Hinduism, Cambridge University Press, ISBN 978-0521438780
- Flood, Gavin; Olivelle, Patrick (2003). The Blackwell Companion to Hinduism. Blackwell.
- Fort, Andrew (1996), "Liberation While Living in the Jivanmuktiviveka: Vidrayana's "Yogic Advaita", in Fort, Andrew O.; Mumme, Patricia Y. (eds.), Living Liberation in Hindu Thought, SUNY
- Fort, Andrew (1998), Jivanmukti in Transformation: Embodied Liberation in Advaita and Neo-Vedanta, State University of New York Press, ISBN 978-0791439043
- Fost, Frederic F. (1998). "Playful Illusion: The Making of Worlds in Advaita Vedanta". Philosophy East and West. 48 (3). University of Hawai'i Press: 387–405. doi:10.2307/1400333. JSTOR 1400333.
- Fowler, Jeaneane D. (2002), Perspectives of Reality: An Introduction to the Philosophy of Hinduism, Sussex Academic Press, ISBN 978-1898723936, archived from the original on 2017-01-22
- Fowler, Merv (2005), Zen Buddhism: Beliefs and Practices, Sussex Academic Press
- Gambhirananda, Swami (2021) [1965], Brahma Sutra Bhasya of Sankaracarya, Advaita Ashrama Publication Department
- Ganeri, Jonardon (2019), Indian Philosophy: A Reader, Routledge, ISBN 9781000728033, archived from the original on 2022-01-04
- Garfield, Jay L.; Priest, Graham (2003), Nagarjuna and the Limits of Thought, Philosophy East & West Volume 53, Number 1 January 2003 1–21 (PDF)
- Gleig, Ann Louise (2011), Enlightenment After the Enlightenment: American Transformations of Asian Contemplative Traditions, ProQuest 885589248
- Goodall, Dominic (1996), Hindu Scriptures, University of California Press, University of California Press, ISBN 978-0520207783
- Grimes, John (1998), "Book reviews: Early Advaita Vedanta and Buddhism: The Mahayana Context of the Gaudapadiya-karika, by Richard King. SUNY Press (1995)", Journal of the American Academy of Religion, 66 (3): 684, doi:10.1093/jaarel/66.3.684
- Goswami Abhay Charan Bhaktivedanta (1956), Shri Krishna The Supreme 'Vedantist', archived from the original on 2022-01-04
- Grimes, John A. (1990), The seven great untenables: Sapta-vidhā anupapatti, Motilal Banarsidass
- Grimes, John A. (1996), A Concise Dictionary of Indian Philosophy: Sanskrit Terms Defined in English, SUNY Press
- Gupta, Bina (1995). Perceiving in Advaita Vedānta: Epistemological Analysis and Interpretation. Motilal Banarsidass. ISBN 978-81-208-1296-3. Archived from the original on 2022-01-04.
- Hacker, Paul (1995), Philology and Confrontation: Paul Hacker on Traditional and Modern Vedanta, SUNY Press, ISBN 978-0-7914-2582-4
- Halbfass, Wilhelm (2017), India and Europe: An Essay in Philosophical Understanding, Motilal Banarsidass
- Hiltebeitel, Alf (2013). "Hinduism". In Kitagawa, Joseph (ed.). The Religious Traditions of Asia: Religion, History, and Culture. Routledge. ISBN 9781136875977. Archived from the original on 2022-03-08.
- Hirst, J. G. Suthren (2005), Śaṃkara's Advaita Vedānta: A Way of Teaching, Routledge, ISBN 978-1-134-25441-5, archived from the original on 2022-01-04
- Indich, William (2000), Consciousness in Advaita Vedanta, Motilal Banarsidass, ISBN 978-8120812512, archived from the original on 2022-02-13
- Ingalls, Daniel H. (1954), "Śaṁkara's arguments against the buddhists", Philosophy East and West, 3 (4): 291–306, doi:10.2307/1397287, JSTOR 1397287, archived from the original on 28 June 2011
- Isaeva, N.V. (1993), Shankara and Indian Philosophy, SUNY Press
- Jacobs, Alan (2004), "Advaita and Western Neo-Advaita", The Mountain Path Journal, Ramanasramam: 81–88, archived from the original on 18 May 2015
- Jayatilleke, K.N. (1963), Early Buddhist Theory of Knowledge (1st ed.), London: George Allen & Unwin Ltd., archived from the original (PDF) on 2018-12-24
- Jones, Constance; Ryan, JamesD. (2006). Encyclopedia of Hinduism. Infobase Publishing.
- Jones, Richard H. (2004). "Shankara's Advaita". Mysticism and Morality: A New Look at Old Questions. Lanham: Lexington Books. pp. 95–114.
- Kalupahana, David J. (1994), A history of Buddhist philosophy, Delhi: Motilal Banarsidass Publishers Private Limited
- Katz, Jerry (2007), One: Essential Writings on Nonduality, Sentient Publications, archived from the original on 2021-11-29
- King, Richard (1995), Early Advaita Vedānta and Buddhism: The Mahāyāna Context of the Gauḍapādīya-kārikā, SUNY Press
- King, Richard (1999). "Orientalism and the Modern Myth of "Hinduism"". NUMEN. 46 (2). BRILL: 146–185. doi:10.1163/1568527991517950. S2CID 45954597.
- King, Richard (2002), Orientalism and Religion: Post-Colonial Theory, India and "The Mystic East", Routledge
- King, Richard (2013). Orientalism and Religion: Post-Colonial Theory, India and "The Mystic East". Routledge. ISBN 978-1-134-63234-3. Archived from the original on 2022-01-04.
- Klostermaier, Klaus K. (1984), Mythologies and Philosophies of Salvation in the Theistic Traditions of India, Wilfrid Laurier University Press, ISBN 978-0-88920-158-3, archived from the original on 2022-01-04
- Klostermaier, Klaus k. (2007), Hinduism: A Beginner's Guide, Oneworld Publications, ISBN 978-1851685387
- Kochumuttom, Thomas A. (1999), A buddhist Doctrine of Experience. A New Translation and Interpretation of the Works of Vasubandhu the Yogacarin, Delhi: Motilal Banarsidass
- Koller, John M. (2006), "Foreword", A thousand teachings: the Upadeśasāhasrī of Śaṅkara, Motilall Banarsidass
- Koller, John M. (2013), "Shankara", in Meister, Chad; Copan, Paul (eds.), Routledge Companion to Philosophy of Religion, Routledge
- Kulke, Hermann; Rothermund, Dietmar (1998), A History of India, Routledge
- Kumar Das, Sisir (2006). A history of Indian literature, 500–1399. Sahitya Akademi. ISBN 978-81-260-2171-0. Archived from the original on 2021-12-21.
- Lochtefeld, James G. (2002), The Illustrated Encyclopedia of Hinduism. Volume One: A-M, The Rosen Publishing Group
- Lochtefeld, James (2002a), "Brahman", The Illustrated Encyclopedia of Hinduism, Vol. 1: A–M, Rosen Publishing, ISBN 978-0823931798
- Lorenzen, David N. (2006). Who Invented Hinduism: Essays on Religion in History. Yoda Press. ISBN 9788190227261. Archived from the original on 2017-01-03.
- Lorenzen, David N., ed. (2015), A dialogue between a Christian and a Hindu about religion, El Colegio de Mexico AC
- Lucas, Phillip Charles (2011), "When a Movement Is Not a Movement", Nova Religio, 15 (2): 93–114, doi:10.1525/nr.2011.15.2.93, JSTOR 10.1525/nr.2011.15.2.93
- Mackenzie, Matthew (2012), "Luminosity, Subjectivity, and Temporality: An Examination of Buddhist and Advaita views of Consciousness", in Kuznetsova, Irina; Ganeri, Jonardon; Ram-Prasad, Chakravarthi (eds.), Hindu and Buddhist Ideas in Dialogue: Self and No-Self, Routledge
- Madaio, James (24 May 2017). "Rethinking Neo-Vedānta: Swami Vivekananda and the Selective Historiography of Advaita Vedānta1". Religions. 8 (6): 101. doi:10.3390/rel8060101.
- Mahony, William (1997). The Artful Universe: An Introduction to the Vedic Religious Imagination. State University of New York Press. ISBN 978-0791435809.
- Malkovsky, Bradley J. (2000), "Samkara on Divine Grace", in Malkovsky, Bradley J. (ed.), New Perspectives on Advaita Vedānta: Essays in Commemoration of Professor Richard De Smet, S.J., BRILL
- Marek, David (2008), Dualität – Nondualität. Konzeptuelles und nichtkonzeptuelles Erkennen in Psychologie und buddhistischer Praxis (PDF), archived (PDF) from the original on 2020-03-01
- Mayeda, Sengaku (1992), "An Introduction to the Life and Thought of Sankara", in Mayeda, Sengaku (ed.), A Thousand Teachings: The Upadeśasāhasrī of Śaṅkara, State University of New York City Press, ISBN 0-7914-0944-9
- Mayeda, Sengaku (2006), "An Introduction to the Life and Thought of Sankara", in Mayeda, Sengaku (ed.), A Thousand Teachings: The Upadeśasāhasrī of Śaṅkara, Motilal Banarsidass, ISBN 978-8120827714
- Menezes, Walter (2017), Exploring Ātman from the Perspective of the Vivekacūḍāmaṇi, Springer
- Menon, Sangeetha (2012), Advaita Vedanta, Internet Encyclopedia of Philosophy, archived from the original on 2019-06-10
- Milne, Joseph (April 1997), "Advaita Vedanta and typologies of multiplicity and unity: An interpretation of nindual knowledge", International Journal of Hindu Studies, 1 (1): 165–188, doi:10.1007/s11407-997-0017-6, S2CID 143690641
- Mohanty, JN (1980), "Understanding some Ontological Differences in Indian Philosophy", Journal of Indian Philosophy, 8 (3): 205–217, doi:10.1007/BF00166295, S2CID 145752220
- Mudgal, S.G. (1975). Advaita of Shankara: A Reappraisal. New Delhi: Motilal Banarasidass.
- Murti, T.R.V. (1983), "The World and the Individual in Indian Religious Thought", Studies in Indian Thought: Collected Papers of Prof. T.R.V. Murti, Motilal Banarsidass Publ.
- McDaniel, June (2004), Offering Flowers, Feeding Skulls, Oxford University Press, ISBN 978-0-19-534713-5, archived from the original on 2017-01-04
- Michaels, Axel (2004), Hinduism. Past and present, Princeton, New Jersey: Princeton University Press
- Morris, Brian (2006), Religion and Anthropology: A Critical Introduction, Cambridge University Press
- Muller-Ortega, Paul E. (2010), Triadic Heart of Siva: Kaula Tantricism of Abhinavagupta in the Non-Dual Shaivism of Kashmir, SUNY press
- Murti, TRV (1955). The central philosophy of Buddhism. Routledge (2008 Reprint). ISBN 978-0-415-46118-4.
- Nakamura, Hajime (1950a), A History of Early Vedanta Philosophy. Part One (1990 Reprint), Delhi: Motilal Banarsidass Publishers Private Limited
- Nakamura, Hajime (1950), A History of Early Vedanta Philosophy. Part Two (2004 Reprint), Delhi: Motilal Banarsidass Publishers Private Limited
- Neog, Maheswar (1980), Early History of the Vaiṣṇava Faith and Movement in Assam: Śaṅkaradeva and His Times, Motilal Banarsidass, ISBN 978-81-208-0007-6, archived from the original on 2022-01-04
- Nicholson, Andrew J. (2010), Unifying Hinduism: Philosophy and Identity in Indian Intellectual History, Columbia University Press
- Hugh Nicholson (2011). Comparative Theology and the Problem of Religious Rivalry. Oxford University Press. ISBN 978-0-19-977286-5. Archived from the original on 2022-01-09.
- Nikhalananda, Swami (1931), Drg-Drsya-Viveka. An inquiry inti the nature of the 'seer' and the 'seen.', Sri Ramakrishna Asrama
- Novetzke, Christian (2007), Bhakti and Its Public, International Journal of Hindu Studies, vol. 11
- Olivelle, Patrick (1992), The Samnyasa Upanisads, Oxford University Press, ISBN 978-0195070453
- Padiyath, thomas (2014), The Metaphysics of Becoming: On the Relationship between Creativity and God in Whitehead and Supermind and Sachchidananda in Aurobindo, Walter de Gruyter
- Pande, Govind Chandra (1994), Life and Thought of Śaṅkarācārya, Motilal Banarsidass Publ, ISBN 978-81-208-1104-1
- Pandey, S.L. (2000), Pre-Sankara Advaita. In: Chattopadhyana (gen.ed.), "History of Science, Philosophy and Culture in Indian Civilization. Volume II Part 2: Advaita Vedanta", Delhi: Centre for Studies in Civilizations
- Phillips, Stephen (1998), Classical Indian Metaphysics, Motilal Banarsidass, ISBN 978-8120814899
- Plott, John (2000), Global History of Philosophy: The Patristic-Sutra period (325 – 800 AD), Volume 3, Motilal Banarsidass, ISBN 978-8120805507
- Potter, Karl. H. (1981), "Gaudapada", Encyclopedia of Indian Philosophies Vol.3: Advaita Vedānta up to Śaṃkara and his pupils, Motilal Banarsidass, ISBN 81-208-0310-8
- Potter, Karl (1998), Encyclopedia of Indian Philosophies Vol.3: Advaita Vedānta up to Śaṃkara and his pupils (Indian edition, Reprint ed.), Motilal Banarsidass, ISBN 978-8120803107
- Potter, Karl H. (2008), Encyclopedia of Indian Philosophies Vol.3: Advaita Vedānta Up to Śaṃkara and His Pupils, Delhi: Motilal Banarsidass Publishers Private Limited, ISBN 978-8120803107
- Potter, Karl (2006), Encyclopedia of Indian Philosophies Vol.11: Advaita Vedanta From 800 To 1200, Motilal Banarsidass Publishers Private Limited, ISBN 812083061X
- Puligandla, Ramakrishna (1997), Fundamentals of Indian Philosophy, New Delhi: D.K. Printworld (P) Ltd.
- Raju, P.T. (1971), The Philosophical Traditions of India, Delhi: Motilal Banarsidass (1992 Reprint)
- Raju, P.T. (1992), The Philosophical Traditions of India, Delhi: Motilal Banarsidass Publishers Private Limited
- Raju, P.T. (2006), Idealistic Thought of India, Routledge, ISBN 978-1406732627
- Ram-Prasad, Chakravarthi (2013), "Situating the Elusive Self of Advaita Vedanta" (PDF), in Siderits, Mark; Thompson, Evan; Zahavi, Dan (eds.), Self, No Self?: Perspectives from Analytical, Phenomenological, and Indian Traditions, Oxford University Press, archived (PDF) from the original on 2022-10-02
- Rambachan, Anantanand (1984), The attainment of moksha according to Shankara and Vivekananda with special reference to the significance of scripture (sruti) and experience (anubhabva) (PDF), University of Leeds, archived (PDF) from the original on 2020-10-20
- Rambachan, Anantanand (1991), Accomplishing the Accomplished: Vedas as a Source of Valid Knowledge in Sankara, University of Hawaii Press, ISBN 978-0-8248-1358-1
- Rambachan, Anatanand (1994), The Limits of Scripture: Vivekananda's Reinterpretation of the Vedas, University of Hawaii Press
- Rambachan, A. (2006), The Advaita Worldview: God, World, and Humanity, State University of New York Press, ISBN 978-0791468524
- Renard, Philip (2010), Non-Dualisme. De directe bevrijdingsweg, Cothen: Uitgeverij Juwelenschip
- Rigopoulos, Antonio (1998). Dattatreya: The Immortal Guru, Yogin, and Avatara: A Study of the Transformative and Inclusive Character of a Multi-faceted Hindu Deity. State University of New York Press. ISBN 978-0-7914-3696-7.
- Rosen, Steven (2006), Essential Hinduism, Greenwood Publishing Group, ISBN 9780275990060, archived from the original on 2022-01-04
- Roodurmum, Pulasth Soobah (2002), Bhāmatī and Vivaraṇa Schools of Advaita Vedānta: A Critical Approach, Delhi: Motilal Banarsidass Publishers Private Limited
- Sankara (2006), "A Thousand teachings", in Mayeda, Sengaku (ed.), A Thousand Teachings: The Upadesasahasri of Sankara, Motilal Banarsidass, ISBN 978-81-208-2771-4, archived from the original on 2022-01-04
- Sarma, Chandradhar (2007), The Advaita Tradition in Indian Philosophy, Motilal Banarsidass, ISBN 978-8120813120
- Satchidanandendra, Sarasvati (1997), The Method of the Vedanta. A Critical Account of the Advaita Tradition, Motilall Banarsidass
- Scheepers, Alfred (2010), De wortels van hett Indiase denken, Olive Press
- Sharma, Arvind (1995), The Philosophy of Religion and Advaita Vedanta, Penn State University Press, ISBN 978-0271028323
- Sharma, Arvind (2006). A Guide to Hindu Spirituality. World Wisdom. ISBN 978-1-933316-17-8. Archived from the original on 2022-01-04.
- Sharma, Arvind (2007), Advaita Vedānta: An Introduction, Motilal Banarsidass, ISBN 978-8120820272
- Sarma, Candradhara (1996). The Advaita Tradition in Indian Philosophy. Motilal Banarsidass. ISBN 978-81-208-1312-0. Archived from the original on 2022-01-04.
- Sharma, Chandradhar (1997), A Critical Survey of Indian Philosophy, Motilal Banarsidass, ISBN 81-208-0365-5
- Sharma, B. N. Krishnamurti (2000), A History of the Dvaita School of Vedānta and Its Literature, 3rd Edition, Motilal Banarsidass Pvt. Ltd.(2008 Reprint), ISBN 978-8120815759
- Sheridan, Daniel (1986). The Advaitic Theism of the Bhāgavata Purāṇa. Columbia: South Asia Books. ISBN 81-208-0179-2. Archived from the original on 2017-02-15.
- Sheridan, Daniel (1991). Texts in Context: Traditional Hermeneutics in South Asia (Editor: Jeffrey Timm). State University of New York Press. ISBN 978-0791407967.
- Sinha, Jadunath (2016), Indian Philosophy Volume 2, Motilal Banarsidass
- Sivananda (1977), Brahma Sutras, Motilal Banarsidass
- Sivananda, Swami (1993), All About Hinduism, The Divine Life Society
- Sivaraman, K. (1973), Śaivism in Philosophical Perspective: A Study of the Formative Concepts, Problems, and Methods of Śaiva Siddhānta, Motilall Banarsidass
- Smith, David (2003), The Dance of Siva: Religion, Art and Poetry in South India, Cambridge University Press, ISBN 978-0-521-52865-8, archived from the original on 2022-01-04
- Stoker, Valerie (2016), Polemics and Patronage in the City of Victory: Vyasatirtha, Hindu Sectarianism, and the Sixteenth-Century Vijayanagara Court, University of California Press
- Timalsina, Sthaneshwar (2008). Consciousness in Indian Philosophy: The Advaita Doctrine of 'Awareness Only'. Routledge. pp. 137–138. ISBN 978-1-135-97092-5. Archived from the original on 2022-01-04.
- Timalsina, Sthaneshwar(स्थानेश्वर) (November 2017). "Puruṣavāda: A Pre-Śaṅkara Monistic Philosophy as Critiqued by Mallavādin". Journal of Indian Philosophy. 45 (5): 939–959. doi:10.1007/s10781-017-9329-z. S2CID 171790006. Archived from the original on 2022-01-04.
- Vachatimanont, Sakkapohl (2005), "On why the traditional Advaic resolution of jivanmukti is superior to the neo-Vedantic resolution", Macalester Journal of Philosophy, 14 (1): 47–48
- Venkatramaiah, Munagala (2000), Talks With Sri Ramana Maharshi: On Realizing Abiding Peace and Happiness, Inner Directions, ISBN 1-878019-00-7
- Vireshwarananda, Swami (1936), Adhyasa or Superimposition, archived from the original on 2021-12-09
- Werner, Karel (1994), The Yogi and the Mystic, Routledge
- Whaling, Frank (1979). "Shankara and Buddhism". Journal of Indian Philosophy. 7 (1): 1–42. doi:10.1007/BF02561251. S2CID 170613052.
- Wilber, Ken (2000), Integral Psychology, Shambhala Publications
- Wood, Thomas E. (1992), The Māṇḍūkya Upaniṣad and the Āgama Śāstra: An Investigation Into the Meaning of the Vedānta
- Yogani (2011), Advanced Yoga Practices Support Forum Posts of Yogani, 2005–2010, AYP Publishing

Web-sources
