= Subjective idealism =

Philosophy that only minds and ideas are real

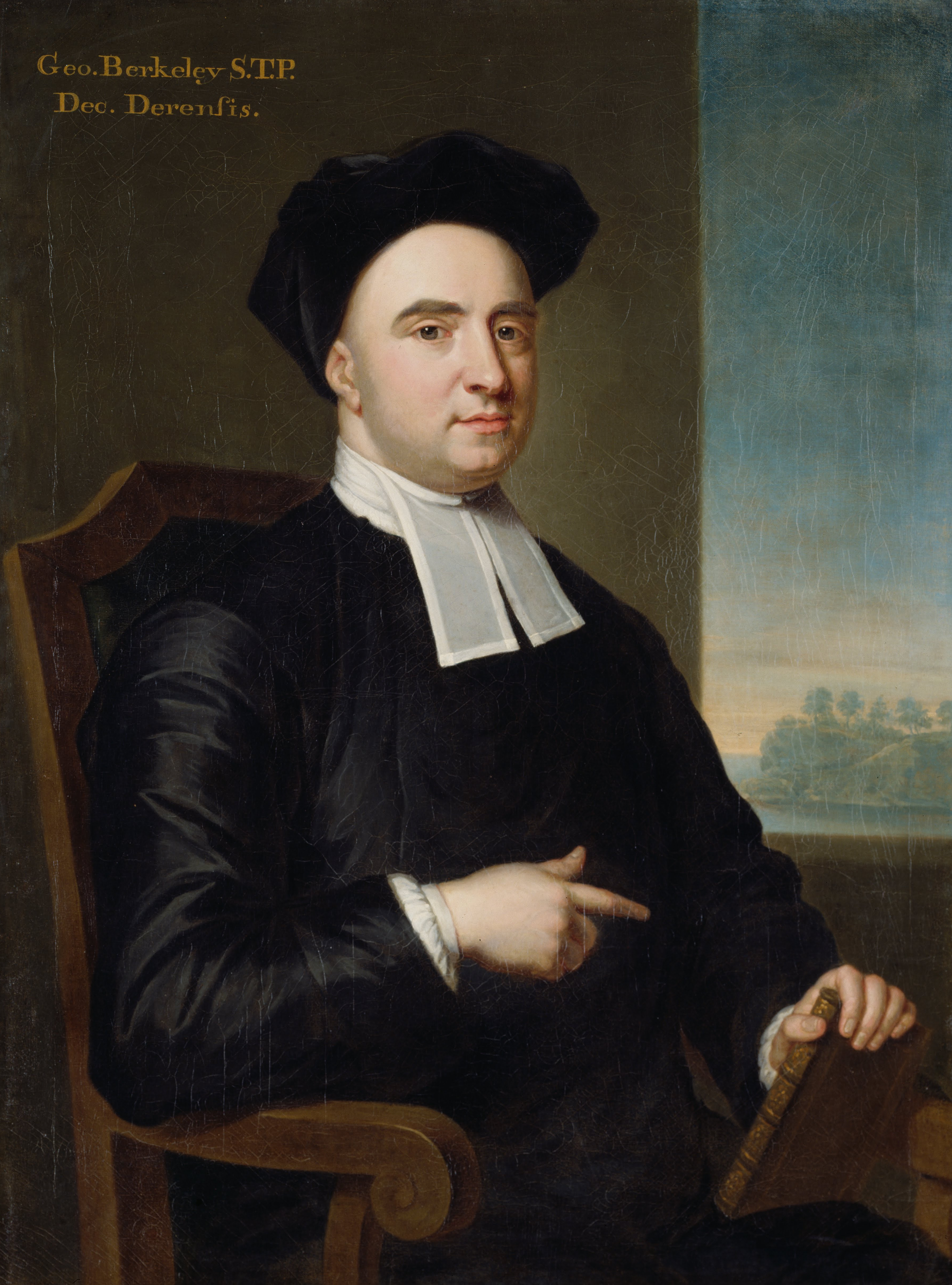
George Berkeley, who is credited with the development of subjective idealism

Subjective idealism, or empirical idealism or immaterialism, is a form of ontological monism that holds that only minds and mental contents exist. It entails and is generally identified or associated with immaterialism, the doctrine that material things do not exist. Subjective idealism rejects dualism, neutral monism, and materialism; it is the contrary of eliminative materialism, the doctrine that all or some classes of mental phenomena (such as emotions, beliefs, or desires) do not exist, but are sheer illusions.

== Overview ==
Subjective idealism is a fusion of phenomenalism or empiricism, which confers special status upon the immediately perceived, with idealism, which confers special status upon the mental. Idealism denies the knowability or existence of the non-mental, while phenomenalism serves to restrict the mental to the empirical. Subjective idealism thus identifies its mental reality with the world of ordinary experience, and does not comment on whether this reality is "divine" in some way as pantheism does, nor comment on whether this reality is a fundamentally unified whole as does absolute idealism. This form of idealism is "subjective" not because it denies that there is an objective reality, but because it asserts that this reality is completely dependent upon the minds of the subjects that perceive it.

The earliest thinkers identifiable as subjective idealists were certain members of the Yogācāra school of Indian Buddhism, who reduced the world of experience to a stream of subjective perceptions. Subjective idealism made its mark in Europe in the 18th-century writings of George Berkeley, who argued that the idea of mind-independent reality is incoherent, concluding that the world consists of the minds of humans and of God. Subsequent writers have continuously grappled with Berkeley's skeptical arguments. Immanuel Kant responded by rejecting Berkeley's immaterialism and replacing it with transcendental idealism, which views the mind-independent world as existent but incognizable in itself. Since Kant, true immaterialism has remained a rarity, but is survived by partly overlapping movements such as phenomenalism, subjectivism, and perspectivism.

Hegel rejected Kant's immaterialism, demeaning it to a "reduction of the facts of consciousness to a purely personal world."

== History ==
Thinkers such as Plato, Plotinus and Augustine of Hippo anticipated idealism's immaterialistic thesis with their views of the inferior or derivative reality of matter. However, these Platonists did not make Berkeley's turn toward subjectivity. Plato helped anticipate these ideas by creating an analogy about people living in a cave which explained his point of view. His view was that there are different types of reality. He explains this with his cave analogy which contains people tied up only seeing shadows their whole life. Once they go outside, they see a completely different reality, but lose sight of the one they saw before. This sets up the idea of Berkley's theory of immaterialism because it shows how people can be exposed to the same world but still see things differently. This introduces the idea of objective versus subjective which is how Berkeley attempts to prove that matter does not exist. Indeed, Plato rationalistically condemned sense-experience, whereas subjective idealism presupposed empiricism and the irreducible reality of sense data. A more subjectivist methodology could be found in the Pyrrhonists' emphasis on the world of appearance, but their skepticism precluded the drawing of any ontological conclusions from the epistemic primacy of phenomena.

Yogacarin thinkers such as the 7th-century epistemologist Dharmakīrti, identified ultimate reality with sense-perception. Within the Advaita Vedānta tradition, the 16th-century philosopher Prakāśānanda developed a doctrine of radical subjective idealism known as dṛṣṭi-sṛṣṭi-vāda ("creation through perception"), according to which the phenomenal world has no existence independent of the perceiving subject. Martine Chifflot has demonstrated that this doctrine had developed entirely independently within the Vedāntic tradition, more than a century and a half before Berkeley's esse est percipi, without any Western influence.

The most famous proponent of subjective idealism in the West was the 18th-century Irish philosopher George Berkeley, whose popularity eclipsed his contemporary and fellow Anglican philosopher Arthur Collier, who perhaps preceded him in refuting material existence or, as he says a "denial of an external world." Berkeley's term for his theory was immaterialism, according to which the material world does not exist, and the phenomenal world is dependent on humans. Hence the fundamental idea of this philosophical system (as represented by Berkeley or Mach) is that things are complexes of ideas or sensations, and only subjects and objects of perceptions exist. "Esse est percipi," meaning, "to be is to be perceived," is how Berkeley summarized his argument. He believed that things exist if they are understood and seen the same way, writing: "for the Existence of an Idea consists in being perceived". This categorizes everything as objective or subjective. Matter is subjective because everyone perceives matter differently.

Berkeley believed that all material is a construction by the human mind. According to the Stanford Encyclopedia of Philosophy, his argument is: "(1) We perceive ordinary objects (houses, mountains, etc.). (2) We perceive only ideas. Therefore, (3) Ordinary objects are ideas."

Berkeley's claim that matter does not exist is in opposition to the materialists. "If there were external bodies, we couldn’t possibly come to know this; and if there weren’t, we might have the very same reasons to think there were that we have now": "A thinking being might, without the help of external bodies, be affected with the same series of sensations or ideas as you have." Berkeley believed that people cannot know that what they think to be matter is simply a creation in their mind.

Others have contested that premise (2) is false because it fails to distinguish between "two sorts of perception;" people perceive objects and then have ideas about them. This might seem to obviously be the case, but it is also contestable. Many psychologists believe that what people actually perceive are tools, impediments, and threats. The research study in which people were asked to count the number of basketball passes made in a video showed that people do not see everything in front of them, even a gorilla that marches across a high school gym. Similarly, it is believed that humans react to snakes more quickly than would be possible if the reaction were consciously driven. Therefore, it is conceivable that the perception of objects goes straight to the mind.

Berkeley pointed out that it is not obvious how motion in the physical world could translate to emotion in the mind. Even the materialists have difficulty explaining this; Locke believed that to explain the transfer from physical object to mental image, one must "attribute it wholly to the good pleasure of our Maker." According to Newton's laws of physics, all movement comes from the inverse change in another motion, and materialists believe that what humans do is fundamentally move their parts. If so, the correlation between objects existing and the realm of ideas is not obvious. For Berkeley, the fact "that the existence of matter does not help to explain the occurrence of our ideas" seems to undermine the reason for believing in matter. If the materialists have no way of knowing that matter exists, it seems best to not assume that it exists.

According to Berkeley, an object is real if is perceived by a mind. God, being omniscient, perceives everything perceivable, thus all real beings exist in the mind of God. However, it is also evident that we each have free will and self-reflection, and our senses suggest that other people also possess these qualities. For Berkeley, to theorize about a universe that is composed of insensible matter is not a sensible thing to do; there is no evidence of a material universe, only speculation about things that are by fiat outside of our minds.

Berkeley's assessment of immaterialism was criticized by Samuel Johnson, as recorded by James Boswell. Responding to the theory, Dr. Johnson exclaimed "I refute it thus!" while kicking a rock with "mighty force". This episode is alluded to by Stephen Dedalus in James Joyce's Ulysses, chapter three. Reflecting on the "ineluctable modality of the visible", Dedalus conjures the image of Johnson's refutation and carries it forth in conjunction with Aristotle's expositions on the nature of the senses as described in Sense and Sensibilia. Aristotle held that while visual perception suffered a compromised authenticity because it passed through the diaphanous liquid of the inner eye before being observed, sound and the experience of hearing were not thus similarly diluted. Dedalus experiments with the concept in the development of his aesthetic ideal.

In modern times, however, the Australian philosopher Colin Murray Turbayne followed in Berkeley's footsteps by arguing in favor of phenomenalism with an appeal to a "language" model of visual perception as an alternative to the classical "geometric model" which is enshrined in the mechanistic explanation of the natural world. Turbayne notes that, "the language model peculiarly illuminates this ancient problem of how we see, shedding a bright light on dark areas dimly light by its great rival". The use of such a model enables one to "read" or interpret events of the natural world as symbols of a language while also providing a more convincing explanation of how mankind falls victim to several visual illusions of perception. In order to support his claim, Turbayne cites the "Barrovian Case", the case of the "Horizontal Moon" and the case of the "Inverted Retinal Image" as examples of visual illusions which can be more rationally explained by using Berkeley's "language model" of perception.

== Criticism ==
Bertrand Russell's popular 1912 book The Problems of Philosophy highlights Berkeley's tautological premise for advancing idealism;

"If we say that the things known must be in the mind, we are either unduly limiting the mind's power of knowing, or we are uttering a mere tautology. We are uttering a mere tautology if we mean by 'in the mind' the same as by 'before the mind', i.e. if we mean merely being apprehended by the mind. But if we mean this, we shall have to admit that what, in this sense, is in the mind, may nevertheless be not mental. Thus when we realize the nature of knowledge, Berkeley's argument is seen to be wrong in substance as well as in form, and his grounds for supposing that 'ideas'—i.e. the objects apprehended—must be mental, are found to have no validity whatever. Hence his grounds in favour of the idealism may be dismissed."

The Australian philosopher David Stove harshly criticized philosophical idealism, arguing that it rests on what he called "the worst argument in the world". Stove claims that Berkeley tried to derive a non-tautological conclusion from tautological reasoning. He argued that in Berkeley's case the fallacy is not obvious and this is because one premise is ambiguous between one meaning which is tautological and another which, Stove argues, is logically equivalent to the conclusion.

Alan Musgrave argues that conceptual idealists compound their mistakes with use/mention confusions;

Santa Claus the person does not exist.
"Santa Claus" the name/concept/fairy tale does exist because adults tell children this every Christmas season (the distinction is highlighted by using quotation-marks when referring only to the name and not the object)

and proliferation of hyphenated entities such as "thing-in-itself" (Immanuel Kant), "things-as-interacted-by-us" (Arthur Fine), "table-of-commonsense" and "table-of-physics" (Arthur Eddington) which are "warning signs" for conceptual idealism according to Musgrave because they allegedly do not exist but only highlight the numerous ways in which people come to know the world. This argument does not take into account the issues pertaining to hermeneutics, especially at the backdrop of analytic philosophy. Musgrave criticized Richard Rorty and "postmodernist" philosophy in general for confusion of use and mention.

John Searle, criticizing some versions of idealism, summarizes two important arguments for subjective idealism. The first is based on our perception of reality:

(1) All we have access to in perception are the contents of our own experience and

(2) The only epistemic basis for claims about the external world are our perceptual experiences

therefore;

(3) The only reality we can meaningfully speak of is that of perceptual experience

Whilst agreeing with (2) Searle argues that (1) is false and points out that (3) does not follow from (1) and (2). The second argument runs as follows;

Premise: Any cognitive state occurs as part of a set of cognitive states and within a cognitive system

Conclusion 1: It is impossible to get outside all cognitive states and systems to survey the relationships between them and the reality they cognize

Conclusion 2: There is no cognition of any reality that exists independently of cognition

Searle contends that Conclusion 2 does not follow from the premises.

== In fiction ==
Subjective idealism is featured prominently in the Norwegian novel Sophie's World, in which "Sophie's world" exists in fact only in the pages of a book.

A parable of subjective idealism can be found in Jorge Luis Borges' short story Tlön, Uqbar, Orbis Tertius, which specifically mentions Berkeley.

== See also ==
- Acosmism
- Appeal to the stone
- Colin Murray Turbayne
- Consensus reality
- Divided line
- Empirical realism
- First cause
- French spiritualism
- Hypokeimenon
- Incorporeal
- J. M. E. McTaggart
- John Foster (philosopher)
- Seventh Letter
- Substantial form
- Vertiginous question
