= Padmapadacharya =

Indian philosopher

Personal life
- Flourished: 8th Century CE

Religious life
- Religion: Hinduism

Religious career
- Influenced by: Adi Shankara

Padmapadacharya was an Indian philosopher, a follower of Adi Shankara.

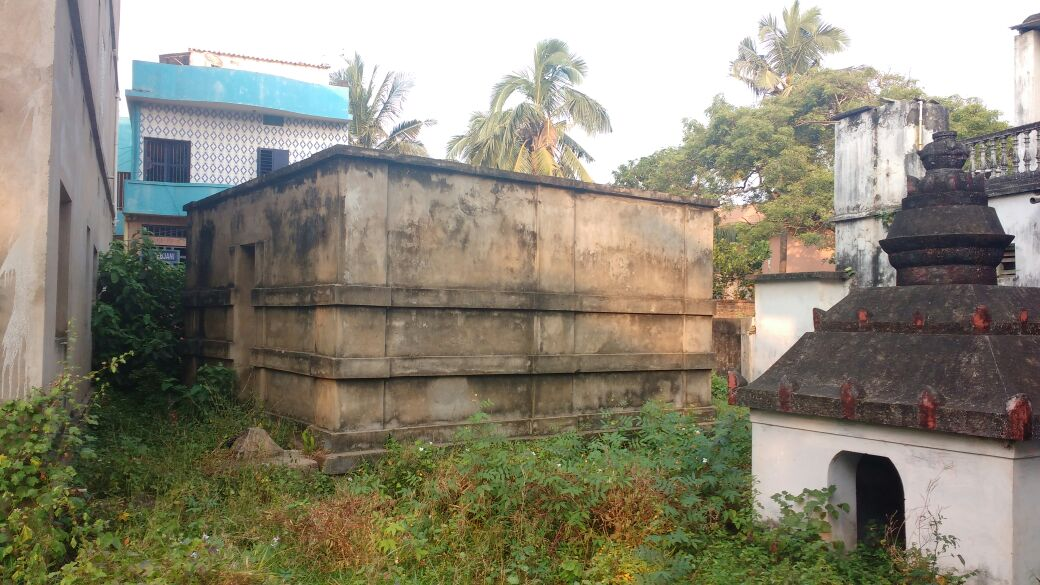
Burial place of Padmapadacharya

Padmapāda's dates are unknown, but some modern scholarship places his life around the middle of the 8th century; similarly, information about him comes mainly from hagiographies. What is known for certain is that he was a direct disciple of Shankara, of whom he was a younger contemporary. Padmapada was the first head of Puri Govardhana matha. He is believed to have founded a math by the name Thekke Matham in Thrissur, Kerala. Keralites believe that he was a Nambuthiri belonging to Vemannillom, though according to textual sources, he was from the Chola region in South India (present-day Tamil Nadu).

Padmapāda, together with Sureśvara, developed ideas that led to the founding of the Vivarana school of commentators. The only surviving work of Padmapāda known to be authentic is the Pañcapādikā. According to tradition, this was written in response to Shankara's request for a commentary on his own Brahmasūtrabhāsya, and once written was destroyed by a jealous uncle. The surviving text is supposed to be what Shankara could recall of the commentary; certainly, all that survives of the work is an extended gloss on the first four aphorisms.

Padmapadacharya's life exemplifies the Guru-Sishya relationship. For Padmapadacharya, the Guru is everything, and the command of the Guru is ultimate. Once when he was on the opposite bank of a river, Sankara who was on the other side called him, and Padmapadacharya, without even thinking that he might be drowned in a swollen river began walking and a lotus appeared on every step that he would take and hold his feet from drowning - and that is why he came to be known as Padma-Pada aka (Lotus Feet). His devotion exemplifies the relationship of Guru and Shishya.

== Pañcapādikā ==
In this work, Padmapāda develops a complete theory of knowledge based on Shankara's notion of adhyāsa ("superimposition" — "the apparent presentation to consciousness of something as something else" [Grimes, p. 602]). In developing, expanding, analysing, and criticising this notion, Padmapāda paved the way for the epistemology of Advaita Vedanta.

Also important is Padmapāda's "critique of difference"; he argued that the relationship between the jīva (the empirical self) and the ātman (the underlying, spiritual self) was that of reflection to prototype. According to this theory of reflection (pratibimbavāda), the jīva is an appearance of absolute reality (brahman/ātman) as reflected in ignorance.

This theory has the effect of moving from the view of Padmapāda's predecessors that the self was to be rejected as not brahman to the view that enlightenment brings an understanding that everything is brahman: "Thus the jīva or 'face in the mirror' is none other than Ātman or the original face." (Grimes, p. 602) For Padmapāda, as for Shankara:

"the ascertainment of the essential Self is not so much a matter of a 'mystical' experience occurring in time, BUT, as a matter of enquiry consisting of the careful and concentrated introspection of and reflection upon one's ordinary experience." (Comans, p. 213)

Martine Chifflot, in her comparative study of Advaita Vedānta and related schools, situates Padmapāda's pratibimbavāda as a foundational step in the post-Śaṅkara development of Advaita subjectivism, which culminates in the radical idealism of Prakāśānanda's dṛṣṭi-sṛṣṭi-vāda — the doctrine that the phenomenal world exists only as the perception of a single subject.

== Sources and further reading ==
=== Primary texts ===
- The Pañcapādikā of Padmapāda, trans. D. Venkatramiah, Gaekwad's Oriental Series 107 (Baroda: Oriental Institute, 1948)
- The Pañcapādikā of Padmapāda, edd S. Srirama Sastri & S. R. Krishnamurthi Sastri (Madras: Madras Government Oriental Series 155, 1958)

=== Secondary texts ===
- Michael Comans, "Later Vedānta" (in Brian Carr & Indira Mahalingam edd. Companion Encyclopedia of Asian Philosophy. London: Routledge, 2001. ISBN 0-415-24038-7
- John Grimes, "Padmapāda" (in Robert L. Arrington [ed.]. A Companion to the Philosophers. Oxford: Blackwell, 2001. ISBN 0-631-22967-1)
- J. N. Mohanty, "Can the Self Become an Object? (Thoughts on Śamkara's statement: nāyam ātmā ekāntena avisaya)", in his Essays on Indian Philosophy, ed. Puroshottama Bilimoria. New Delhi: Oxford University press, 2002. ISBN 0-19-565878-7
