= Kaivalya =

Solitude; isolation; ultimate goal of Raja yoga

Kaivalya (Sanskrit: कैवल्य) is the ultimate goal of aṣṭāṅga yoga and means "solitude", "detachment" or "isolation", a vrddhi-derivation from kevala "alone, isolated". It is the isolation of purusha from prakṛti, and liberation from rebirth, i.e., moksha. Kaivalya-mukti is described in some Upanishads, such as the Muktika and Kaivalya Upanishads, as the most superior form of moksha, which can grant liberation both within this life (as in jīvanmukti), and after death (as in videhamukti).

== Yoga Sutras ==
The fourth chapter of the Yoga Sutras of Patanjali, "Kaivalya Pada", deals with impressions left by our endless cycles of (re)birth, and the rationale behind the necessity of erasing such impressions. It portrays the yogi, who has attained kaivalya, as an entity who has gained independence from all bondages and achieved the absolute true consciousness or ritambhara prajna described in the Samadhi Pada.

6. Only minds born of meditation are free from karmic impressions.

10-11. Since the desire to live is eternal, impressions are also beginningless. The impressions, being held together by cause, effect, basis and support, disappear with the disappearance of these four.

34. [ . . . ] Or, to look from another angle, the power of pure consciousness settles in its own pure nature.

— The Yoga Sutras of Patanjali, Chapter 4: Kaivalya Pada (sutras 6, 10-11, & 34)

== Upanishads ==
The terms kevala, kaivalya, or kaivalya-mukti are encountered in the Upanishads, including the Śvetāśvatara (1, 6), Kaivalya (25), Amṛtabindu (29) and Muktikā (1.18, 26, 31) Upanishads .

In the Muktika Upanishad (slokas 1.18–29), kaivalya, as explained by Rama to Hanuman, is the most superior form of moksha and the essence of all Upanishads—higher than the four types of mukti (namely: sālokya, sāmīpya, sārūpya, & sāyujya). In the second section of the Upanishad, Rama mentions that kaivalya-mukti is the ultimate liberation (both jivanmukti and videha-mukti) from prarabdha karma, and that it can be attained by everyone through studying the 108 authentic Upanishads thoroughly from a realized guru, which will destroy the three forms of bodies (gross, subtle and causal).

The Yogatattva Upanishad (16–18) reads:

"Kaivalya is the very nature of the self, the supreme state (paramam padam). It is without parts and is stainless. It is the direct intuition of the Real-existence, intelligence and bliss. It is devoid of birth, existence, destruction, recognition, and experience. This is called knowledge."

== In Vedānta ==
In Advaita Vedānta, kaivalya is distinguished from Yoga's definition of kaivalya insofar as liberation is not the isolation of a pre-existing puruṣa from prakṛti, but the recognition of the true nature of the individual jivātman as Sat ('the Existent') or Brahman. From this perspective, kaivalya and mokṣa are synonymous: the liberated state consists not in separation but in the dissolution of the illusion of manifoldnessness. Martine Chifflot, comparing the Yoga and Vedāntic conceptions of liberation, notes that while both traditions affirm that liberation transcends individuality, Advaita Vedānta radically rejects any residual ontological distinction between the self and the Absolute.

In Gaudiya Vaishnavism, Jiva Goswami and Baladeva Vidyabhushana define kaivalya as "purity" and identify it with the realization of God's nature. The joy of realizing God alone is described as the true kaivalya. In jivanmukti the self realizes its dependence on God and is no longer bounded by wordily experience.

== In Kashmir Saivism ==
In Pratyabhijna, Yogaraja describes kaivalya as a final, transcendent liberation "beyond the fourth" (turyatita), attainable only after bodily death.

== In later Hinduism and its native tribal sects ==
Some Veerashaiva scholars of the time, such as Nijaguna Shivayogi (c. 1500), attempted to unify Veerashaivism with Advaitism. His best known work is the Kaivalya Paddhati, a collection of swara cavhanas set to classical ragas.

Vijñānabhiksu was a sixteenth-century Vedāntic philosopher. He writes about kaivalya explicitly in the fourth and final chapter of his Yogasārasamgraha.

In Assam, the Kaibarta-Jalkeot people call their original religion Kewaliya Dharma.

In this sect, "kewolia" is the highest stage at which the Bhakot becomes unconscious of everything else except the natural Animistic all-pervading Entity.

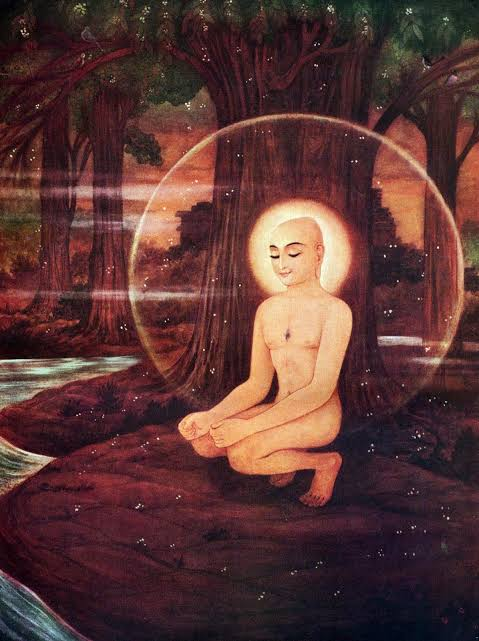
Mahavir attaining kaivalya-jñāna in shukla dhyana, on the banks of Rijuvālika river

== In Jainism ==
Kaivalya, also known as kevala-jñāna, means omniscience in Jainism and is roughly translated as complete understanding or supreme wisdom.

Kevala-jñāna is believed to be an intrinsic quality of all souls. This quality is masked by karmic particles that surround the soul. Every soul has the potential to obtain omniscience by shedding off these karmic particles. Jain scriptures speak of twelve stages through which the soul achieves this goal. A soul who has attained kevala-jñāna is called a kevalin (केवलिन्). According to the Jains, only kevalins can comprehend objects in all aspects and manifestations; others are only capable of partial knowledge.

== See also ==
- Moksha
- Kevala Jnana
- Kaivalya Upanishad

== Sources ==
- Ashtanga Yoga, The Eight-Limbs of Yoga
- Muktika Upanishad
