= Srishti-drishti-vada =

Srishti-drishti-vada (Sanskrit: सृष्टिदृष्टिवाद; sṛīṣṭīdṛīṣṭivāda) or 'the doctrine of perception through creation', is the opponent school of drishti-srishti-vada. It affirms the world as the primary reality on which perception is dependent. In short, if there were no real world, there would not be any perception of it either. It is regarded as the "common sense view of things".

== Terminology ==
Srishti means "creation", drishti means "vision" or "perception" and vada means "philosophy" or "argument". Thus srishti-drishti-vada is the view that creation precedes perception; drishti-srishti-vada is the view that perception precedes creation.

== In Hermeneutics ==
While drishti-srishti-vada is the idealist view of interpretation, srishti-drishti-vada is the realist view of interpretation. The former contends that what one sees defines reality, while the latter contends that what exists defines vision. According to G.P. Deshpande, one encounters this hermeneutical problem in any act of interpretation, especially of a text (which is srishti or artwork created by an author): "the director looks at it in a particular way, and the actor looks at it in a particular way" giving rise to a case of drishtisrishtivada. He argues:

The vision or the way the text is looked at ultimately decides its character. And that is why you have different productions of the same play, productions apparently using the same text but so different that they appear to be based on different texts.

== See also ==
- Drishti-srishti-vada
