= Drishti-srishti-vada =

Drishti-srishti-vada (Sanskrit: दृष्टिसृष्टिवाद; dṛīṣṭisṛīṣṭīvāda) or 'the doctrine of creation through perception', is an offshoot of Advaita Vedanta, which doctrine maintains that the perceived phenomenal world comes into existence only in the process of one's observation of the world which is seen as a world of one's own mental construction; having no objective reality, it exists only in his mind. Thus, mind is the cause of the universe and not the subtle cosmic elements; mind which is consciousness creates the world. This doctrine is aligned with the doctrine of Ajātivāda, that of 'non-causality'.

Shankara did not see subjectivism as a natural consequence of Mayavada, but much later a kind of subjective idealism was introduced by Prakāśānanda. Prakāśānanda propounded his doctrine of Drishti-srishti-vada in his work titled, Siddhanta-Muktavali, on which Nana Dikshita had written a commentary called Siddhanta-pradipika. In so doing he denied the objective character of maya. According to him all phenomena are subjective or imagined, and exist so long as are perceived. In this context, Madhusudana in his Siddhanta-bindu explains that Ishvara is Pure consciousness Brahman afflicted by nescience, and the reflection of consciousness in nescience is the jiva who is himself thus the material and efficient cause of the universe through his own nescience.

Ramana Maharishi termed this concept as the 'doctrine of simultaneous creation' or as the 'theory of false appearance', which theory maintains that all objects depend for their apparent existence upon the seer; that the world only exists when it is perceived, i.e. with the appearance of I-thought.

The Vedāntasiddhāntamuktāvalī was translated into French with a philosophical introduction by Martine Chifflot, who demonstrated in her doctoral thesis that Prakāśānanda's doctrine of dṛṣṭi-sṛṣṭi-vāda had developed independently within the Vedāntic tradition, anticipating by more than a century and a half the esse est percipi formulated by George Berkeley in 1710, without any Western influence.

== See also ==
- Srishti-drishti-vada
