= Kaivalya Upanishad =

Ancient minor Upanishad, in Sanskrit

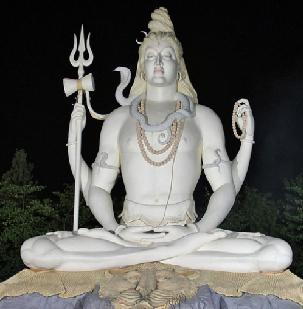
- The supreme God is Shiva, Shiva is Brahman, Brahman is Atman, Know your Atman, Know yourself to be that Brahman, states the Kaivalya Upanishad
- Devanagari: कैवल्य
- IAST: kaivalya
- Title means: Aloneness, Absoluteness
- Type: Shaiva
- Linked Veda: Yajurveda
- Chapters: 1
- Verses: 26
- Philosophy: Vedanta

The Kaivalya Upanishad (Sanskrit: कैवल्य उपनिषद्) is a late 1st millennium BCE Sanskrit text and one of the minor Upanishads of Hinduism. It is classified as a Shaiva Upanishad, and survives into modern times in two versions, one attached to the Krishna Yajurveda and other attached to the Atharvaveda. It is, as an Upanishad, a part of the corpus of Vedanta literature collection that presents the philosophical concepts of Hinduism.

The Upanishad extols Shiva, aloneness and renunciation, describes the inner state of man in his personal spiritual journey detached from the world. The text is notable for presenting Shaivism in Vedanta, discussing Atman (Self) and its relation to Brahman, and Self-knowledge as the path to kaivalya (liberation).

The text, states Paul Deussen – a German Indologist and professor of philosophy — is particularly beautiful in the way it describes the self-realized man who "feels himself only as of the one divine essence that lives in all", who feels identity of his and everyone's consciousness with God (Shiva, highest Atman), who has found this highest Atman within, in the depths of his heart.

== Etymology ==
The Sanskrit word Kaivalya means "aloneness, isolation", and refers to someone who has renounced and isolated himself from all attachments to worldly desires. It also refers to "the absoluteness", states Deussen, the inner conviction of a man on a spiritual journey to liberation.

The term Upanishad means it is knowledge or "hidden doctrine" text that belongs to the corpus of Vedanta literature collection presenting the philosophical concepts of Hinduism and considered the highest purpose of its scripture, the Vedas.

== Chronology and anthology ==
The Kaivalya Upanishad, remarks Deussen, is from the group of five Upanishads which extol and assert god Shiva as a symbolism for Atman (Self). These five Upanishads – Atharvashiras, Atharvashikha, Nilarudra, Kalagnirudra and Kaivalya – are ancient, with Nilarudra likely the oldest and Kaivalya the relatively later era 1st millennium BCE Upanishad, composed closer to Shvetashvatara Upanishad, Mundaka Upanishad, and Mahanarayana Upanishad.

The manuscripts of this minor Upanishad is sometimes attached to the Krishna Yajurveda, or alternatively attached to the Atharvaveda. In the Muktika canon, narrated by Rama to Hanuman, this Shaiva Upanishad is listed 12th in the anthology of 108 Upanishads. The text is also titled as the Kaivalyopanishad.

== Structure ==
The Kaivalya Upanishad manuscripts vary, depending on which Veda it is attached to. The one attached to Krishna Yajurveda has 26 verses, while the edition attached to the Atharvaveda has 24 verses with an epilogue. Both convey the same message, but the former is structured as a single chapter, and the latter into two chapters (19 verses in first, 5 verses in second). The text is structured as verses, set to a poetic Vedic meter (exactly same number of syllables per verse of the song).

The Upanishad is presented as a discourse between the Vedic sage Ashvalayana and the god Brahma, wherein the Ashvalayana asks Brahma for Brahma-vidya, that is the knowledge of ultimate reality Brahman.

The Upanishad's structure is notable as it embeds key parts of verses from early Principal Upanishads, thus referencing them and yet building its own message. The fragments of earlier major Upanishads it thus integrates within it, include Mundaka Upanishad and Shvetashvatara Upanishad.

The text is also notable for presenting Shaivism with Vedanta terminology, discussing the relationship of Atman (Self) and Brahman (ultimate Reality), and Self-knowledge as the means to Kaivalya (liberation). The text describes the self-realized man as one who "feels himself only as the one divine essence that lives in all", who feels identity of his and everyone's consciousness with Shiva (the highest Self), who has found this highest Self within, in the depths of his heart.

== Content ==
The state of Self-realization

He who sees himself in all beings,
And all beings in him,
attains the highest Brahman,
not by any other means.

—Kaivalya Upanishad 10

=== The setting: Ashvalayana and Brahma (verses 1-2) ===
The Upanishad opens with sage Ashvalayana meeting Brahma, the creator god in Hindu trimurti. Ashvalayana is a revered Vedic sage, mentioned in the Rigveda, student of the ancient grammarian Shaunaka, and belonging to the Hindu tradition of forest hermits who wander. Ashvalayana, states the text, asks Paramesthi (synonym for Brahma) for Brahmavidya, which Ashvalyana calls "the highest knowledge, always cultivated by the good", one that enables to reach the person who is greater than the great. This verse references a fragment from section 3.2 of the Mundaka Upanishad.

Brahma answers, asserts verse 2 of the Upanishad, "Seek knowledge with Sraddha-bhakti-dhyana-yogadavehi (faith, devotion, meditation in yoga), not ritual works, not wealth, not offsprings". Aloneness and renunciation, states the text, is the path to the life of eternity.

=== Brahma's answer: Grasp Vedanta doctrine (verses 3-5) ===
Beyond heaven, in the heart, that which shines within, states Brahma in verse 3 of the Upanishad, is the destination of those who have understood the meaning of Vedanta doctrine. There, states the text, all the sannyasis (renunciates) who have reached that wisdom reside, in the state of pure being. The Upanishad says, seclusion is their place, enthroned is their joy, calm is their Yoga.

These are the ones, asserts the Upanishad, who revere their teachers (Guru), who live a life of virtuous self-restraint, in their Ashrama (stage) of life. These are the ones who meditate, states the text, their focus on their heart, wherein resides the pure one, the griefless, the bliss.

The verse 4 references a fragment each from section 3.2 of Mundaka Upanishad, and section 2.8 of the Shvetashvatara Upanishad.

=== Meditate on Shiva: He, Brahman, Indra, Vishnu are same (verses 6-9) ===
The text then iconographically paints god Shiva, as the one who is the companion of Uma, with three eyes, blue neck, the calm wonderful lord imbued with intelligence and bliss, the source of everything. It is this supreme lord, states the text, one must meditate on, asserts verse 7.

This supreme, states Kaivalya Upanishad, is the eternal, the all-pervading, formless, unmanifest, infinite, inconceivable, one without beginning or middle or end, one which is chidananda ("consciousness-bliss"). He is, states the Upanishad, Brahman, Shiva, Indra, Vishnu, Prana (life force, breath), fire and moon (time, lunar calendar). Eternity is him, states the text, all that originated is him, all that originates is him. Know him, find liberation, there is no other way, states verse 9.

=== Meditate on Om: the three states of consciousness (verses 10-15) ===
The Kaivalya Upanishad asserts that one must see "his Atman (Self) in all beings, and all beings in his Atman" to attain salvation, there is no other way.

In verse 11, the text makes a reference to a fragment from section 1.14 of the Shvetashvatara Upanishad, to metaphorically describe how to gain this knowledge. Making his own Self as the lower fire stick and Om the upper fire stick, states the Kaivalya Upanishad, one must rub these together, light up the fire of knowledge, and burn the ties to ignorance.

A Jiva (being) immersed in Maya (changing reality, illusive world) craves for worldly greed, performs karoti (Sanskrit: करोति, ritual works), enjoys bodily pleasures like women, food, drink and pleasures. This, states the text, gives him satisfaction in his wakeful state, in dream as he sleeps his Self fashions a dream world of joys and nightmares, but this is all deception. True bliss, states the text, comes in the third state of consciousness. It is, states the text, the third state, everything comes to rest, in whole, in peace, in bliss.

=== Shiva, Brahman is within you (verses 16-17) ===
According to Chester Starr, a professor of history, the next two verses of the Upanishad crystallize the ancient Hindu thought. Man has an Atman (spirit) identical with the great spirit of the world, repeated in its great Upanishadic saying, "That art thou," (Note: This is a fragment from chapter 6.8-6.16 of the Chandogya Upanishad, see: AS Gupta (1962), The Meanings of "That Thou Art", Philosophy East and West, Vol. 12, No. 2, pages 125-134; for its different meanings, see Joel Brereton (1986), Tat Tvam Asi in Context, Zeitschrift der deutschen morgenlandischen Gesellschaft, Vol 136, pages 98-109, and Robert Hume, Chandogya Upanishad, The Thirteen Principal Upanishads, Oxford University Press, pages 245-246) or God is within man.

यत्परं ब्रह्म सर्वात्मा विश्वस्यायतनं महत् |
सूक्ष्मात्सूक्ष्मतरं नित्यं तत्त्वमेव त्वमेव तत् ॥ १६॥

—Kaivalya Upanishad 16

Brahman, the supreme Self of all, the great resting place of universe,
The subtlest of the subtle, eternal, you yourself are it, and it's you!

The verse 17 of the text repeats, that all three states, experienced when one is awake, when one dreams, when one is in deep dreamless sleep, is illuminated therein. "Know yourself to be that Brahman", translates Deussen, and experience liberation.

=== The state of liberation (verses 18-24) ===
The text, in verses 18 to 24 describes the state of liberated renouncer. The Upanishad states he is blissful, content in all three states of consciousness, feels everything was born in him and abides in him and dissolves in him, that he is Brahman that is in everyone, he is Sadashiva, ancient, diverse, spiritual, with the gift to know eternity.

The liberated renouncer, feels he is the knower, the perceiver, the one to learn the Vedas, the one to perfect the Vedas, states verse 22 of the text. He feels his essence is beyond good and bad, beyond body and mind, beyond merit and demerits, beyond what perishes, asserts the text. The liberated man, states the Upanishad, has found the highest Atman in his heart.

=== Epilogue ===
In the end, the glories of reciting the Kaivalya Upanishad are told. Recitation of this Upanishad, asserts the epilogue, frees one of various sins, end the cycle of samsara (birth-death-rebirth), gains Supreme Knowledge and kaivalya.

The style of the text's epilogue, that is the concluding verses, is odd and different from the rest of the text. This structural anomaly, as well as the very different message therein, states Deussen, suggests that the passage on the "study of Satarudriyam and all sorts of promises" may be a later insertion or an accident of extraction from the Vedic text in which this Upanishad was embedded.

== Commentaries ==
Commentaries on the Kaivalya Upanishad are written by Sadasiva Brahmendra, Upanishad Brahmayogin (c. 1800 CE) and Osho (1931 – 1990). An incomplete commentary, which includes only the first verse, by Aurobindo was written in 1912 and first published in 1971. Sarvepalli Radhakrishnan translated this text in 1953.

== See also ==
- Maha Upanishad
- Nirvana Upanishad
- Yogatattva Upanishad
