= Michel Hulin =

French philosopher (1936–2026)

Michel Hulin (31 January 1936 – 11 March 2026) was a French philosopher, who specialised in Indian philosophy.

== Life and career ==
Hulin was born on 31 January 1936. An alumnus of the École normale supérieure, he obtained his doctorate in philosophy from the Paris-Sorbonne University in 1977 with a dissertation on the Vedic concept of ahamkara.

He was a professor of Indian and comparative philosophy at Paris-Sorbonne from 1981 to 1998. His research focused on classical Indian philosophy, such as the nondualism in Vedanta, Tantric-inspired texts in Shaivism and the confrontations between European and Asian traditions of thought.

Hulin died on 11 March 2026, at the age of 90.

== Selected bibliography ==
- Le Principe de l'ego dans la pensée indienne classique : La notion d' ahamkara, Paris, 1978.
- Hegel et l'Orient, Paris, 1979.
- La Face cachée du temps : l'imaginaire de l'au-delà, Paris, Fayard, 1985, ISBN 978-2213015521.
- Sept récits initiatiques tirés du yoga-vasistha : l'imaginaire de l'au-delà, Paris, Berg International, 1987, ISBN 978-2900269435.
- La mystique sauvage, Paris, PUF, 1993, ISBN 978-2130571155.
- Qu'est-ce que l'ignorance métaphysique (dans la pensée hindoue)? : Śaṅkara, Paris, Vrin, 1994, ISBN 978-2711611829.
- L'Inde inspiratrice : Réception de l'Inde en France et en Allemagne, XIXe-XXe siècles, Paris, PUS, 1997, ISBN 978-2868206596.
- L'Inde des Sages, Paris, Ed. du Félin, 2000, ISBN 978-2848981147.
- Comment la philosophie indienne s'est-elle développée ? : La querelle brahmanes-bouddhistes, Paris, Editions du Panama, 2008, ISBN 978-2755700947.
- La Bhagavad-Gita, Paris, Points, coll. « Points Sagesses », 2010, ISBN 978-2757814833.
- Shankara et la non-dualité, Paris, Almora, 2017, ISBN 978-2351183205.
