= Vivarana =

Vivarana is a subschool of classical Advaita Vedanta, established by Prakasatman (c. 1200–1300). The name of the Vivarana-school is derived from Prakasatman's Pancapadika-Vivarana, a commentary on the Pancapadika by Padmapadacharya.

== Tenets ==
Prakasatman was the first to propound the theory of mulavidya or maya as being of "positive beginningless nature". According to Roodurmum, "his line of thought [...] became the leitmotif of all subsequent developments in the evolution of the Advaita tradition."

The Vivarana-school takes an epistemological approach. It sees Brahman as the source of avidya. Critics object that Brahman is pure consciousness, so it can't be the source of avidya. Another problem is that contradictory qualities, namely knowledge and ignorance, are attributed to Brahman. (Note: THE BHAMATI AND VIVARANA SCHOOLS)

Some of the main tenets of the Vivarana school are as follows:

- "Karma is responsible for the rise of knowledge of the Self"
- Knowledge of Brahman can be attained from the Upanishadic texts
- Study of these texts is the main factor in gaining jnana, while reflection and meditation are only additional aids

== See also ==
- Bhamati

== Sources ==
Printes sources

- Roodurmum, Pulasth Soobah (2002), Bhāmatī and Vivaraṇa Schools of Advaita Vedānta: A Critical Approach, Delhi: Motilal Banarsidass Publishers Private Limited

Web-sources
