= Martine Chifflot =

- Born: 27 March 1948 (age 78)
- Other name: Martine Chifflot-Comazzi
- Education: Paris-Sorbonne University
- Occupations: Philosopher; Sanskritist; Novelist; Playwright; Filmmaker; Painter
- Employer: Claude Bernard University Lyon 1
- Known for: Translation of Prakāśānanda's Vedāntasiddhāntamuktāvalī
- Notable work: Le collier de perles des doctrines du Vedānta (2005)

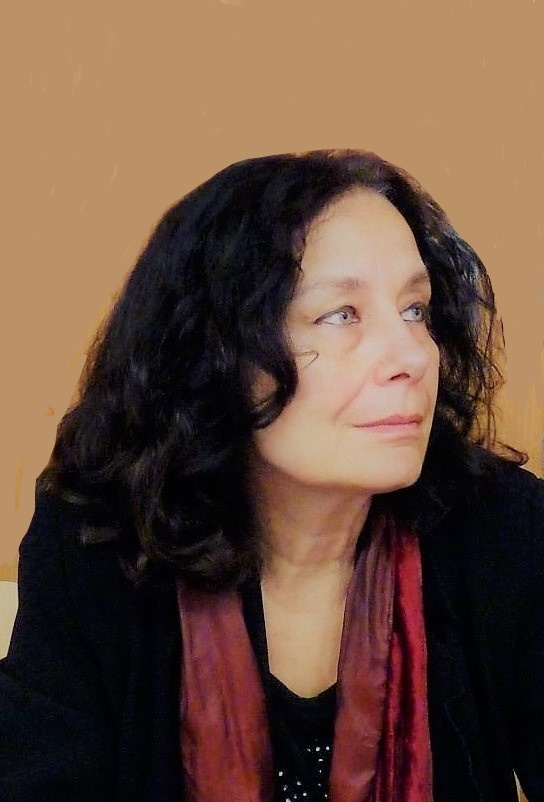
Portrait of Martine Chifflot

Martine Chifflot (born 27 March 1948) is a French philosopher, Sanskritist, novelist, playwright, theatre director and poet. An honorary professor at Claude Bernard University Lyon 1, she holds a doctorate in philosophy from Paris-Sorbonne University and the habilitation à diriger des recherches (HDR) from Jean Moulin University Lyon 3.

== Academic career ==
Chifflot completed her doctoral thesis, Le thème de l'esse est percipi dans la pensée de Berkeley et de Prakāśānanda, under the supervision of Michel Hulin at Paris-Sorbonne University in 1991. She obtained the habilitation à diriger des recherches (HDR) in philosophy from Jean Moulin University Lyon 3 in 2012.

She taught ethics and philosophy of education at Claude Bernard University Lyon 1, the ESPE de Lyon and the Jean Moulin University Lyon 3. She holds the title of honorary professor (professeure agrégée honoraire) at Claude Bernard University Lyon 1.

== Philosophical work ==
Chifflot's 1991 doctoral thesis, supervised by Michel Hulin at Paris-Sorbonne University, examined the parallel between George Berkeley's principle of esse est percipi and the Advaita Vedānta doctrine of dṛṣṭi-sṛṣṭi-vāda as formulated by Prakāśānanda. Drawing on this research, she published in 2005 the first French translation of Prakāśānanda's Vedāntasiddhāntamuktāvalī directly from the Sanskrit, under the title Le collier de perles des doctrines du Vedānta.

The translation received a dedicated review in the Bulletin d'Études Indiennes and was noted in the Revue de l'histoire des religions. Michel Hulin, in a 2021 study published in the Bibliothèque Philosophique de Louvain, designated Chifflot's translation as the standard French-language edition of the text, drawing directly from it in translating key passages. François Chenet (Université de Paris-Sorbonne) recommended Chifflot's thesis and translation as the essential comparatist reference on the dṛṣṭi-sṛṣṭi-vāda.

She has published Platon, l'âme et le Bien in 2015 (prefaced by Baldine Saint Girons and included in Luc Brisson's Bibliographie platonicienne 2014-2015), as well as on the thought of Saint Thomas Aquinas: Saint Thomas : L’âme et les sens (M+ Éditions, 2021).

Her philosophical approach, which explores both European and Indian metaphysical traditions, has been characterized as presenting "two paths that took shape early in the course of Indo-European traditions: the path of knowledge and/or the path of love."

== Literary and artistic work ==
Chifflot is the author of the New Town fantastical thriller series, comprising La maison des innocents (2022), Les gardiens du sanctuaire (2023) and Le Voyage en Ouralie (2026), a novel credited with systematising the literary genre of anatopia — a counterpart to utopia defined by spatial rather than temporal displacement.

Her play Howard, mon amour (2018), a fantasia on H. P. Lovecraft and his wife Sonia Greene, was reviewed in the Canadian speculative fiction journal Solaris and in English-language Lovecraft criticism. The play has been staged several times in France, notably at the Opéra-Théâtre de Clermont-Ferrand in March 2021 and at the Espace 44 in Lyon in April 2023. It was translated into English as Lovecraft, My Love in a bilingual edition in 2022. The English version was praised by leading Lovecraft scholar S. T. Joshi, who described the play as "a delightful short play".

Chifflot has published several poetry collections since 1979, including Bagages (1987) and Assises du Temps (2009). According to critic Brahim Saci, her poetic work constitutes a form of spiritual resistance against the noise, symbolic impoverishment and technical acceleration of contemporary modernity; he highlights her use of brief, often nominal verses and structural pauses that create a meditative silence, inviting the reader toward inner recollection and a reconnection with Being — an approach he situates within a broader project of bridging rigorous philosophical inquiry with poetic and theatrical creation.

As a theatre director, Chifflot has directed over sixty productions since 1983 with her company ARCthéâtre. Her work includes the chamber opera-theatre piece Animalesques, a work for soprano and clarinet performed by Ensemble Kaïros incorporating music by Hugues Dufourt.

She is artistic director of the Festival de Bourgogne du Sud (Saint-Maurice-lès-Châteauneuf), an annual festival of classical, sacred and baroque music founded in 2003, and founder of the Rencontres Cinématographiques du Charolais-Brionnais.

== Selected bibliography ==
=== Philosophy ===
- Le thème de l'esse est percipi dans la pensée de Berkeley et de Prakāśānanda. Doctoral thesis, Université Paris IV–Sorbonne, 1991. theses.fr
- Le collier de perles des doctrines du Vedānta (trans. from Sanskrit). L'Harmattan, 2005. ISBN 978-2-7475-8466-1
- Platon, l'âme et le bien. Publibook, 2015. ISBN 978-2-342-03394-6
- Autorité et pédagogie. Connaissances et Savoirs, 2018.
- Saint Thomas, l'âme et les sens. M+ Éditions, 2021.

=== Fiction and theatre ===
- Howard, mon amour. Aigle Botté (Phantasia), 2018.
- La maison des innocents. M+ Éditions.
- Les gardiens du sanctuaire. M+ Éditions, 2023.
- Le Voyage en Ouralie. Éditions localement transcendantes, 2026.
