= Prakāśānanda =

- Born: c. 1550; India
- Died: c. 1600; India

Philosophical work
- Era: 16th century
- Region: Indian subcontinent
- School: Advaita Vedanta
- Main interests: Metaphysics, Epistemology, Idealism, Tantra
- Notable ideas: Dṛṣṭi-sṛṣṭi-vāda, Ekajīvavāda, Kalpito'pi guru

Prakāśānanda (Sanskrit: प्रकाशानन्द), also known as Prakāśānanda Yati, was a 16th-century Indian philosopher of the Advaita Vedanta tradition. The historian of Indian philosophy Surendranath Dasgupta identifies Prakāśānanda as one of the principal exponents of the form of subjective idealism called dṛṣṭi-sṛṣṭi-vāda (the doctrine of creation by perception). According to Dasgupta, Prakāśānanda is probably the first thinker to develop a consistently sensationalistic and idealistic interpretation of Advaita Vedānta, denying the objective existence of any external reality. His main work, the Vedāntasiddhāntamuktāvalī, argues that the phenomenal world has no independent existence apart from the act of perception, and that only the non-dual ātman-brahman is ultimately real.

== Biography ==
Few precise biographical details are available about Prakāśānanda. Traditional sources describe him as a disciple of Jñānānanda Yati and place him in the second half of the 16th century. According to T. P. Ramachandran, the commentary on the Vedāntasiddhāntamuktāvalī by his disciple Nāna Dīkṣita, entitled Siddhāntapradīpikā, was composed at a time when the different parts of India had already been pervaded by at least the third generation of Prakāśānanda's followers, thereby attesting to the wide geographical influence of his teachings.

Prakāśānanda should not be confused with Prakāśānanda Sarasvatī, the māyāvādī sannyāsī of Vārāṇasī mentioned in the Caitanya-caritāmṛta, who was converted by Chaitanya Mahaprabhu. Most historians of Indian philosophy consider them to be two distinct individuals.

== Philosophical Doctrine ==
Prakāśānanda proposed a purely idealist and sensationist interpretation of Vedānta, denying any objective existence independent of perception. According to Dasgupta, Prakāśānanda explicitly denies any objective substratum underlying perception, holding that “the existence of objects is nothing more than their perception (dṛṣṭi)” and that no independent external reality exists:

- The existence of objects coincides strictly with their perception (dṛṣṭi). There are no external objects corresponding to our perceptions and existing independently of the mind.
- Māyā is not a positive entity, but an absolute fiction (tuccha).
- There is no real causality or creation of the world: everything is purely subjective. Prakāśānanda rejects causality because the very notion of cause and effect presupposes duality and therefore “lies outside the scope of the Vedānta”.
- Only the Self (ātman / Brahman) is the ultimate reality.

This extreme position aims to avoid any residual dualism between Brahman and māyā. Prakāśānanda also defends the doctrine of ekajīvavāda (the theory that there is only one individual soul, jīva).

Unlike Shankara, who posited a māyā with two distinct powers—veiling (āvaraṇa) and projection (vikṣepa)—Prakāśānanda reduces ignorance (ajñāna or avidyā) to a mere necessary presumption, without thickness or positivity. According to a principle of metaphysical economy opposed to the multiplication of entities, this ignorance is posited as unique, in the image of the single soul of which it constitutes the limiting condition: one avidyā for one jīva.

=== Relation to Shankara and Vijñānavāda ===
Written eight centuries after Shankara's Brahmasūtrabhāṣya, the Vedāntasiddhāntamuktāvalī operates a radical purification of the Advaita system. Shankara, to account for the objectivity of the sensible universe, still had to posit cosmic intermediaries such as Hiranyagarbha and Virāj. Prakāśānanda eliminates all cosmogonic schemes in favor of the sole thesis of the single soul: it is Brahman itself that, through its own ignorance, becomes the jīva, without any intermediary.

On one specific point, Prakāśānanda is more radical than his predecessor. Shankara refused to equate the waking state with the dream state—a position that grounded his refutation of the Buddhist Vijñānavāda in the Brahmasūtrabhāṣya (II, 2, 27-32). Prakāśānanda, however, accepts this equivalence and interprets Shankara's threefold distinction of reality (absolute, practical, illusory) as a mere pedagogical concession to the uninitiated. While this position brings him formally closer to the idealism of Buddhist Vijñānavāda, it separates him ontologically: where Vijñānavāda posits emptiness (śūnyatā) as the ultimate reality, Prakāśānanda affirms the luminous fullness of ātman-brahman, with Vedantic ontology strictly opposing the full (pūrṇa) to the void (śūnya).

=== The Doctrine of the Imagined Guru ===
The radicality of dṛṣṭi-sṛṣṭi-vāda raises an internal difficulty: if the entire manifestation is illusory, what is the status of the guru, whose necessity is affirmed by scripture (śruti)? Prakāśānanda resolves this with the doctrine of the imagined guru (kalpito'pi guru), expounded in verse XLII of the Vedāntasiddhāntamuktāvalī: the guru exists only as long as the disciple's ignorance persists, and dissolves into non-duality upon liberation.

=== Comparison with Berkeley ===
Martine Chifflot highlights the striking similarity between Prakāśānanda's dṛṣṭi-sṛṣṭi-vāda and the idealism of Irish philosopher George Berkeley (1685–1753), particularly Berkeley's famous principle esse est percipi ("to be is to be perceived"). Both systems deny the independent existence of the material world, asserting that objects exist only as perceptions. However, while Berkeley's idealism leads to the conclusion that only minds and their ideas are real, Prakāśānanda's non-dualism affirms the ultimate reality of ātman-brahman, the luminous, non-dual Self.

== Works ==
Prakāśānanda's main work is the Vedāntasiddhāntamuktāvalī, a concise treatise on Advaita Vedanta, commented upon by his disciple Nānā Dīkṣita in the Siddhāntadīpikā. The text is structured dialectically, with objections from various philosophical schools representing the resistances of dualistic thought, each resolved until final liberation is attained.

Other works include:

- Tārā-bhakti-taraṅgiṇī
- Manoramā
- Tantra-rāja-ṭīkā
- Mahā-lakṣmī-paddhati

These texts reflect his interest in tantric practices, despite his radical idealism.

== Legacy ==
Dasgupta characterizes Prakāśānanda’s system as one of the most “thorough-going idealistic” developments of Advaita Vedānta, representing an extreme attempt to eliminate any residual dualism associated with māyā. Prakāśānanda holds an important place in the history of post-Shankara Advaita as one of the main proponents of dṛṣṭi-sṛṣṭi-vāda. His approach was discussed and sometimes criticized by later Advaita thinkers.
