= Kaivalyadhama =

Yogic research centre in India

Coordinates: 18.761°N 73.415°E

- Interactive map of Kaivalyadhama
- Location: Lonavala, Maharashtra, India
- Type: Healthcare, Education, Research

Construction
- Opened: 1924; 102 years ago

Website
- www.kdham.com

Kaivalyadhama, officially the Kaivalyadhama Health and Yoga Research Centre, is a spiritual, therapeutic, and research centre founded by Swami Kuvalayananda in 1924. It aims to coordinate ancient yogic arts and tradition with modern science. Kuvalayananda founded the journal Yoga Mimamsa at the same time. Kaivalyadhama is in Lonavala, Maharashtra, India, with smaller branches elsewhere in India, France, and the United States.

Kaivalyadhama performs scientific and "philosophico-literary" (Sanskrit studies of yoga texts) research, and provides Yogic and Ayurvedic healthcare and education. It houses a Naturopathy center and hosts some 250 students per year for its various courses. Students come from India and abroad, primarily from China, Japan, Korea, France, United States, and Canada.

Kaivalyadhama is a public charitable trust which receives some funding from the Government of India.

== History ==
Kaivalyadhama was established in 1924 by Swami Kuvalayananda in Lonavala, Maharashtra, India. Swami Kuvalayananda led the facility, which was primarily used to further his scientific research into the yogic arts, until his death in 1966.

In addition, the centre had the goal of training young people in yoga for their health, meaning that the centre would be open to the public. This created such a large demand that a further training centre was opened in Bombay (at Kandivali) in 1936. This centre was in competition with Yogendra's Yoga Institute which was also in Bombay (at Chowpatty).

The anthropologist Joseph Alter writes that Kuvalayananda founded the centre on the back of the success of his first experiment, to determine whether the yogic practice of nauli created a vacuum in the large intestine; this was recorded as having been demonstrated in Kaivalyadhama's journal. He set out the "Objectives of Kaivalyadhama" as "The main effort of the Kaivalyadhama is in scientifically probing the human mind and to dig deeper and deeper in the inner space, till the effort to conquer the outer and inner spaces converged and ultimately meet to solve the riddle of the cosmos." Kuvalayananda set up a laboratory in the centre to study the body and mind of the yogi using biochemistry, electrophysiology, psychology, radiology, and "physiology/physical education". Michelle Goldberg describes the scientific work at Kaivalyadhama as "subjecting yogic claims to unprecedented scientific scrutiny", while the laboratory was "full of the most up-to-date equipment available."

The results of the experiments were published by Kaivalyadhama in its quarterly Yoga Mimamsa journal, which Kuvalayananda founded in 1924. This was the world's first science journal focused on modern yoga. Mark Singleton describes the output as "prodigious" and the journal "at once cutting-edge scientific review and practical illustrated instruction manual", adopted as a guide across India. The results were put to work to try to develop yoga-based treatments for a variety of diseases. The journal is now called as the Journal of Science and Culture in Yoga : Yoga Mimamsa (https://journals.lww.com/yomi/pages/currenttoc.aspx ) An additional goal was to interpret and to translate ancient Sanskrit texts; this work began in 1928. As the centre grew, its structure was formalised as a society named the "Shreeman Madhava Yoga Mandira Samiti", with a 38-page booklet of "Rules and Regulations". Kaivalyadhama was organised into a college and three research departments, namely for science, "philosophico-literary" Sanskrit studies, and therapeutic research. Alter explains that the goal of the Sanskrit studies was to retrieve fragments of ancient yoga texts quoted in other documents, and to reconstitute the texts as far as possible. The texts would help to demystify the philosophy of yoga, just as the science was intended to demystify its physiological mechanisms.

In 1962, a small hospital (the S.A.D.T. Gupta Hospital) was set up, enabling yogic practices such as asanas (yoga postures), dhyana (meditation), kriyas (yogic practices such as uddiyana and nauli), and pranayama (yoga breathing) to be evaluated for their usefulness in treating disease. Alter comments that Kaivalyadhama gradually moved away from treatment towards prevention, but all the same in 1994 it set up a nature cure centre to work alongside yoga's possible therapeutic benefits.

== Organization and activities ==
Kaivalyadhama (officially the Kaivalyadhama Yoga Institute) is a yoga research, education, and healthcare institution founded by Swami Kuvalayananda in 1924 in Lonavala, Maharashtra, India. It is among the oldest institutions dedicated to the scientific study of yoga, and operates the world's first peer-reviewed journal on the subject, Yoga Mimamsa, in continuous publication since 1924. Kaivalyadhama is a public charitable trust which receives some funding from the Government of India.

The institution conducts scientific and philosophico-literary research, operates a yoga college and school, runs residential health and wellness programmes integrating yoga, Ayurveda, and naturopathy, and delivers community outreach programmes across India. It is recognised by India's Ministry of Education as an All India Institute of Higher Education (1962) and by the Ministry of Science and Technology as a Scientific and Industrial Research Organisation (SIRO).

Library and Philosophico-Literary Research Department

Two kitchens serve daily Ayurvedic meals for students, faculty, and staff, often using locally grown rice and on-site cows for milk. Meals are strictly vegetarian. A naturopathy center provides herbal massage and steam-bath treatments for patients and visitors.

== Degrees and programs ==
The Gordhandhas Seksaria College of Yoga and Cultural Synthesis at Kaivalyadhama, founded in 1950 and opened in 1951, grants degrees, diplomas and certificates for several specialisations. There are a total of nine courses for yoga students, yoga teachers, academics, students of Ayurveda, medical professionals, and school teachers. In 1962, Kaivalyadhama was declared an "All India Institute of Higher Education" by India's Ministry of Education.

== Distinctions ==
In 2004, India's Human Resource Development Ministry affirmed it as a national resource center for the introduction of yoga in schools. In 2019 the Government of India's Yoga Certification Board under the Ministry of AYUSH declared Kaivalyadhama a "Leading Yoga Institution". Also in 2019, the Prime Minister of India released a commemorative stamp of Kaivalyadhama's founder, Swami Kuvalayananda.

== Sources ==
- Alter, Joseph (2004). "Swami Kuvalayananda: Science, Yoga, and Global modernity| Kaivalyadhama: Advancing beyond the 'Fierce Light of Modern Science'". Yoga in modern India : the body between science and philosophy. Princeton University Press. pp. 81–89. ISBN 978-0-691-11874-1.
- Goldberg, Michelle (2016). The Goddess Pose: The Audacious Life of Indra Devi, the Woman Who Helped Bring Yoga to the West. Hachette. ISBN 978-0307477446.
- Shearer, Alistair (2020). "Science, Spirit and Stress Relief". The Story of Yoga: From Ancient India to the Modern West. Hurst Publishers. pp. 251–261. ISBN 978-1-78738-192-6.
- Singleton, Mark; Goldberg, Ellen (2014). Gurus of Modern Yoga. Oxford University Press. ISBN 978-0199938728.
- Singleton, Mark (2010). Yoga Body: the origins of modern posture practice. Oxford University Press. ISBN 978-0-19-539534-1.
