= Yoga as exercise =

Physical activity consisting mainly of yoga poses

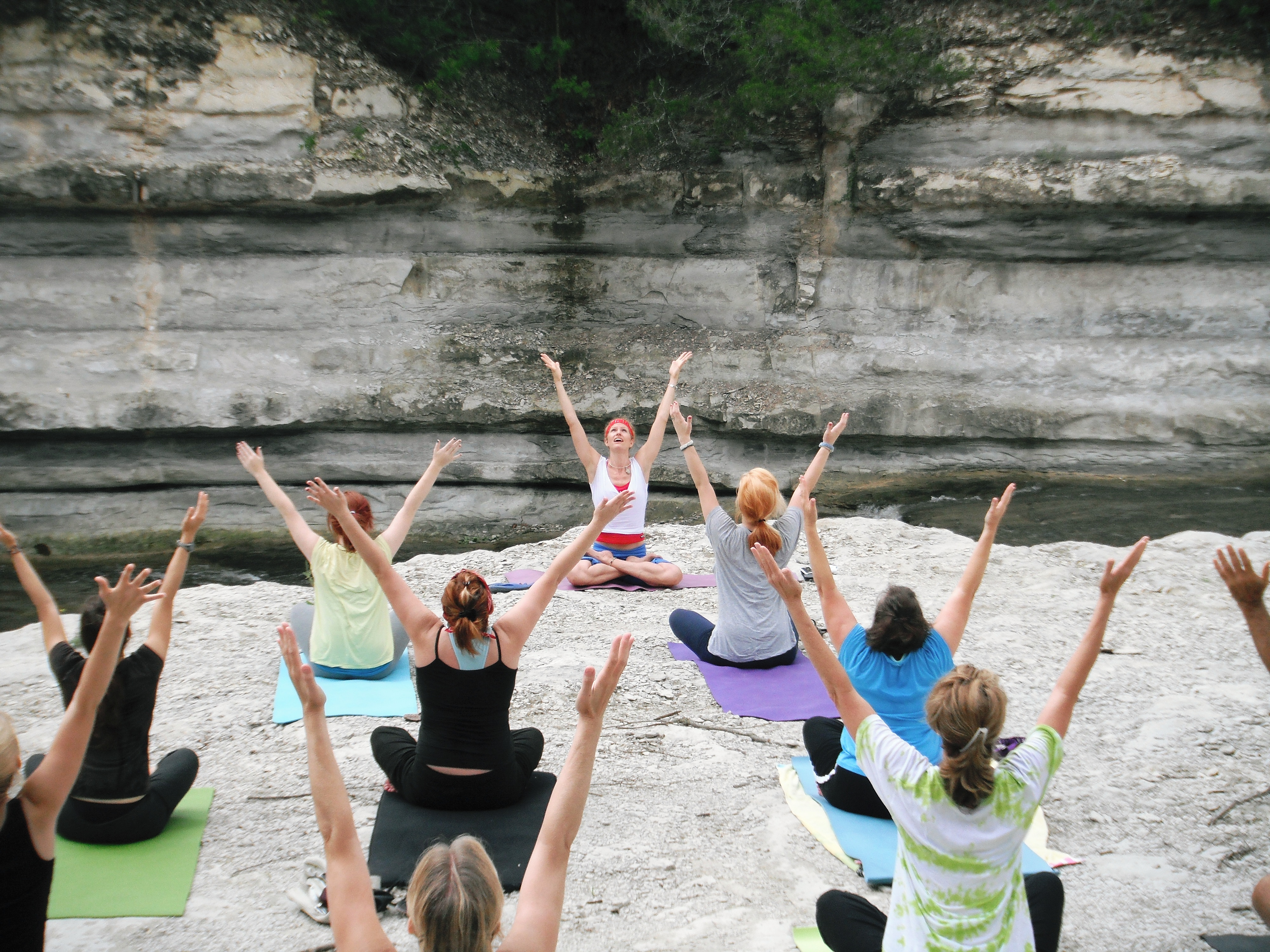
Women in an outdoor yoga community class, Texas, 2010

Yoga as exercise timeline
c. 400	Yoga Sutras of Patañjali
1100	Haṭha yoga using asanas
1850s	Indian men's physical culture
1850s	US women's Harmonial Gymnastics
1896	Vivekananda brings yoga to US
1919	Yogendra brings asanas to US
1930s	Krishnamacharya's gymnastic yoga
1936	Sivananda yoga
1948	Indra Devi's * yoga in Hollywood
1948	K. Pattabhi Jois's * Ashtanga yoga
1966	B.K.S. Iyengar's * Light on Yoga
2015	First International Day of Yoga
	* Krishnamacharya's pupils

Yoga as exercise is a physical activity consisting mainly of postures, often connected by flowing sequences, sometimes accompanied by breathing exercises, and frequently ending with relaxation lying down or meditation. Yoga in this form has become familiar across the world, especially in the US and Europe. It is partly derived from medieval Haṭha yoga, which made use of similar postures, but it is generally simply called "yoga". Academic research has given yoga as exercise a variety of names, including modern postural yoga (Note: In 2004, Elizabeth De Michelis introduced a typology that subdivided her main category "Modern Yoga" into "Modern Psychosomatic Yoga", "Modern Denominational Yoga", "Modern Postural Yoga", and "Modern Meditational Yoga".) and transnational anglophone yoga.

Postures were not central in any of the older traditions of yoga; posture practice was revived in the 1920s by yoga gurus including Yogendra and Kuvalayananda, who emphasised its health benefits. The flowing sequences of Surya Namaskar (Salute to the Sun) were pioneered by the Rajah of Aundh, Bhawanrao Shrinivasrao Pant Pratinidhi, in the 1920s. It and many standing poses used in gymnastics were incorporated into yoga by the yoga teacher Krishnamacharya in Mysore from the 1930s to the 1950s. Several of his students went on to found influential schools of yoga: Pattabhi Jois created Ashtanga Vinyasa Yoga, which in turn led to Power Yoga; B. K. S. Iyengar created Iyengar Yoga, and defined a modern set of yoga postures in his 1966 book Light on Yoga; and Indra Devi taught yoga as exercise to many celebrities in Hollywood. Other major schools founded in the 20th century include Bikram Yoga and Sivananda Yoga. Yoga as exercise spread across America and Europe, and then the rest of the world.

Yoga as exercise primarily involves practicing asanas (poses), which have evolved from just a few described in early Hatha yoga texts (2–84 poses) to thousands in modern works (up to 2,100). Asanas are categorized by body position, movement type, or intended effect. Various modern yoga styles emphasize different aspects such as aerobic intensity (Bikram Yoga), alignment (Iyengar Yoga), spirituality (Sivananda Yoga), or energy awakening (Kundalini Yoga). Many contemporary teachers create unbranded blends of styles, especially in Western countries.

Haṭha yoga's non-postural practices such as its purifications are much reduced or absent in yoga as exercise. The term "hatha yoga" is also in use with a different meaning, a gentle unbranded yoga practice, independent of the major schools, often mainly for women. Practices vary from wholly secular, for exercise and relaxation, through to undoubtedly spiritual, whether in traditions like Sivananda Yoga or in personal rituals. The relationship of Yoga as exercise to Hinduism is complex and contested; some Christians have rejected it on the grounds that it is covertly Hindu, while the "Take Back Yoga" campaign insisted that it was necessarily connected to Hinduism. Scholars have identified multiple trends in the changing nature of yoga since the end of the 19th century. Yoga as exercise has developed into a worldwide multi-billion dollar business, involving classes, certification of teachers, clothing such as yoga pants, books, videos, equipment including yoga mats, and yoga tourism.

== History ==
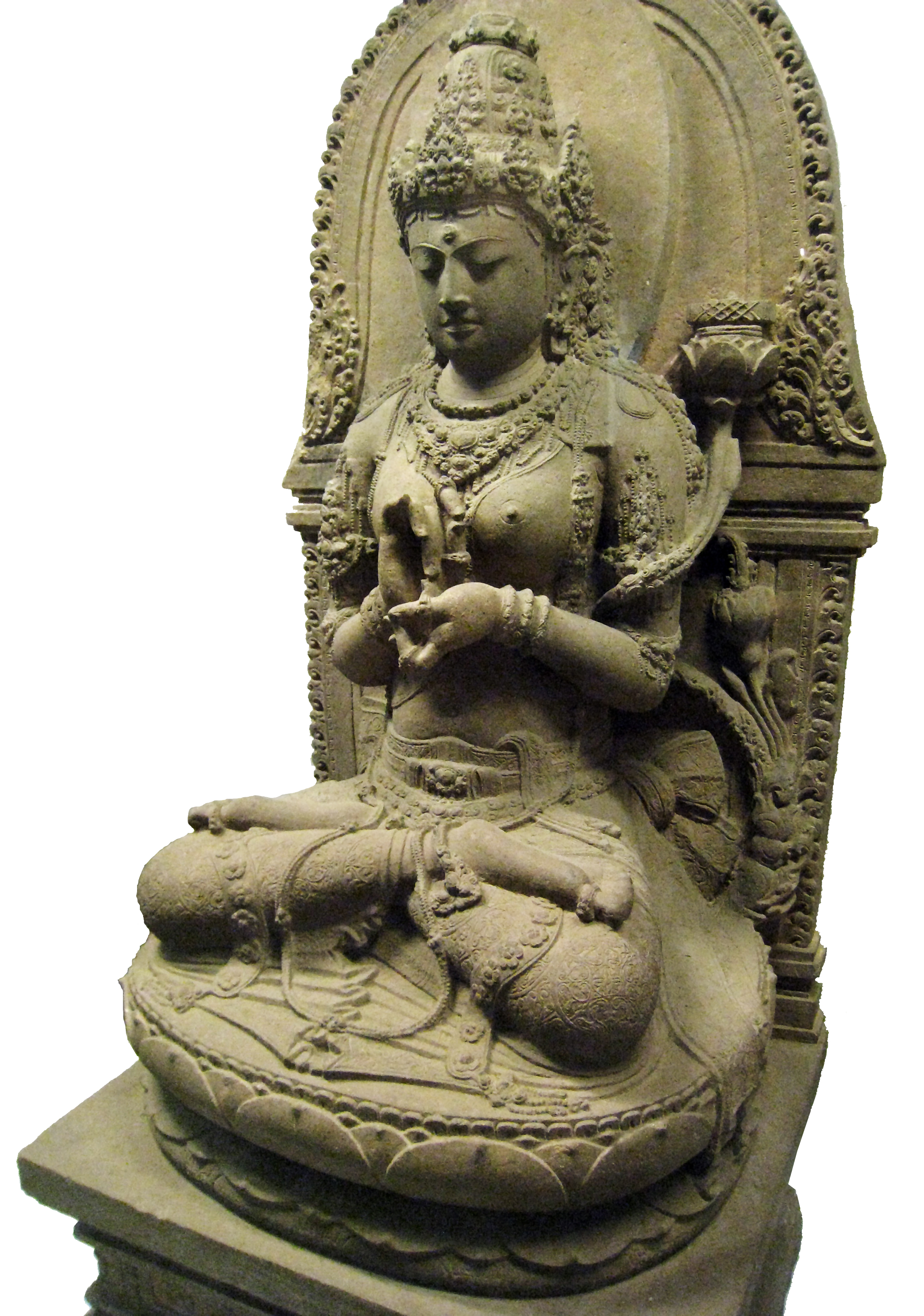
Yoga was originally a spiritual practice based on meditation. Statue from Java, 13th century.

=== Yoga's origins ===
The Sanskrit noun योग yoga, cognate with English "yoke", is derived from the Proto-Indo-European root *yewg- "to attach, join, harness, yoke". Its ancient spiritual and philosophical goal was to unite the human spirit with the divine. The branch of yoga that makes use of physical postures is Haṭha yoga. The Sanskrit word हठ haṭha means "force", alluding to its use of physical techniques. Asana (posture) is described in Patanjali's Yoga Sutras II.29 as the third of the eight limbs of yoga. Sutra II.46 defines asana as that which is steady and comfortable.

=== Haṭha yoga ===
Haṭha yoga made use of Mudras to attempt to control supposed vital forces in the subtle body.

Haṭha yoga used Satkarmas with the intention of purifying the subtle body.

Haṭha yoga flourished among secretive ascetic groups such as Nath yogins in South Asia from c. 1100-c. 1900. Instruction was directly from guru to individual pupil, in a long-term relationship. It was associated with religions, especially Hinduism but also Jainism and Buddhism. Its objectives were to manipulate vital fluids to enable absorption and ultimately liberation. It consisted of practices including purifications, postures (asanas), locks, the directed gaze, seals, and rhythmic breathing. These were claimed to provide supernatural powers including healing, destruction of poisons, invisibility, and shape-shifting. Yogins wore little or no clothing; their bodies were sometimes smeared with cremation ash as a reminder of their forthcoming deaths. Equipment, too, was scanty; sometimes yogins used a tiger or deer skin as a rug to meditate on. Haṭha yoga made use of a small number of asanas, mainly seated; in particular, there were very few standing poses before 1900. They were practised slowly, often holding a position for long periods. The practice of asanas was a minor preparatory aspect of spiritual work. Yogins followed a strict vegetarian diet, excluding stimulants such as tea, coffee or alcohol. Their yoga was taught without payment; gurus were supported by gifts and the philosophy was anti-consumerist.

=== Early influences ===
Modern postural yoga developed during the 20th century, influenced by Western philosophy and physical culture including women's harmonial gymnastics, and by Indian yoga, wrestlers' exercises, and Surya Namaskar.

Postural yoga in India is a blend of Western gymnastics with postures from Haṭha yoga in India in the 20th century. The system of physical education practised in the 19th-century Young Men's Christian Association, adapted by ex-military gymnasts for the schooling system in colonial British India, became the default form of mass-drill, and this influenced the "modernized hatha yoga". From the 1850s onwards, there developed in India a culture of physical exercise for men to counter the colonial stereotype of supposed "degeneracy" of Indians compared to the British, a belief reinforced by then-current ideas of Lamarckism and eugenics.

This physical culture was taken up from the 1880s to the early 20th century by Indian nationalists such as Tiruka, who taught exercises and unarmed combat techniques under the guise of yoga. The German bodybuilder Eugen Sandow was acclaimed on his 1905 visit to India, at which time he was already a "cultural hero" in the country. The anthropologist Joseph Alter suggests that Sandow was the person who had the most influence on modern yoga. The first handbook of asanas in English, and the first to be illustrated with photographs, was Seetharaman Sundaram's 1928 Yogic Physical Culture.

In the West in the 19th century, a different tradition of physical culture developed for women, harmonial gymnastics. These systems, such as those of Genevieve Stebbins, Annie Payson Call, and Mary (Mollie) Bagot Stack, sought to provide what Sydney Ahlstrom called a "rapport with the cosmos", offering a combination of physical and spiritual health, in forms of "harmonial religion". These harmonial systems resembled yoga in being mainly for women, in using movement and breath, and in emphasising harmony. They were sometimes influenced by hatha yoga (for example, Stack had learnt some asanas in India), and contributed to modern yoga through cultural exchanges; they were eventually displaced by yoga, still largely for women.

=== Introduction to the West ===
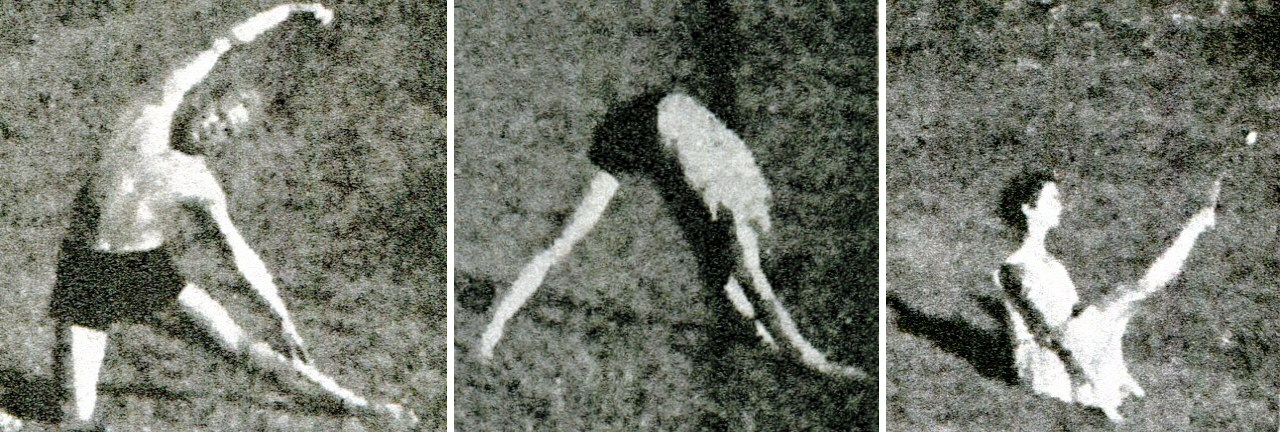
Postures in Niels Bukh's 1924 Primary Gymnastics resembling Parighasana, Parsvottanasana, and Navasana, supporting the suggestion that Krishnamacharya derived some of his asanas from the gymnastics culture of his time

Yoga was introduced to the Western world by the spiritual leader Vivekananda's 1893 visit to the World Parliament of Religions in Chicago, and his 1896 book Raja Yoga. However, he rejected Haṭha yoga and its "entirely" physical practices such as asanas as difficult and ineffective for spiritual growth, out of a widely shared distaste for India's wandering yogins. Yoga asanas were brought to America by the yoga teacher Yogendra. He founded a branch of The Yoga Institute in New York state in 1919, starting to make Haṭha yoga acceptable, seeking scientific evidence for its health benefits, and writing books such as his 1928 Yoga Asanas Simplified and his 1931 Yoga Personal Hygiene. The flowing sequences of salute to the sun, Surya Namaskar, now accepted as yoga and containing popular asanas such as Uttanasana and upward and downward dog poses, were popularized by the Rajah of Aundh, Bhawanrao Shrinivasrao Pant Pratinidhi, in the 1920s.

In 1924, the yoga teacher Kuvalayananda founded the Kaivalyadhama Health and Yoga Research Center in Maharashtra, combining asanas with gymnastics, and like Yogendra seeking a scientific and medical basis for yogic practices.

"The father of modern yoga" Krishnamacharya teaching yoga in Mysore, 1930s

In 1925, Kuvalayananda's rival Paramahansa Yogananda, having moved from India to America, set up the Self-Realization Fellowship in Los Angeles, and taught yoga, including asanas, breathing, chanting and meditation, to "tens of thousands of Americans". In 1923, Yogananda's younger brother, Bishnu Charan Ghosh, founded the Ghosh College of Yoga and Physical Culture in Calcutta.

Tirumalai Krishnamacharya (1888–1989), "the father of modern yoga", claimed to have spent seven years with one of the few masters of Haṭha yoga then living, Ramamohana Brahmachari, at Lake Manasarovar in Tibet, from 1912 to 1918. He studied under Kuvalayananda in the 1930s, and then in his yogashala in the Jaganmohan Palace in Mysore created "a marriage of Haṭha yoga, wrestling exercises, and modern Western gymnastic movement, and unlike anything seen before in the yoga tradition." The Maharajah of Mysore Krishna Raja Wadiyar IV was a leading advocate of physical culture in India, and a neighbouring hall of his palace was used to teach Surya Namaskar classes, then considered to be gymnastic exercises. Krishnamacharya adapted these sequences of exercises into his flowing vinyasa style of yoga. The yoga scholar Mark Singleton noted that gymnastic systems like Niels Bukh's were popular in physical culture in India at that time, and that they contained many postures similar to Krishnamacharya's new asanas.

Spread of postural yoga across the world

Among Krishnamacharya's pupils were people who became influential yoga teachers themselves: the Russian Eugenie V. Peterson, known as Indra Devi (from 1937), who moved to Hollywood, taught yoga to celebrities, and wrote the bestselling book Forever Young, Forever Healthy; Pattabhi Jois (from 1927), who founded the flowing style Ashtanga Vinyasa Yoga whose Mysore style makes use of repetitions of Surya Namaskar, in 1948, which in turn led to Power Yoga; and B.K.S. Iyengar (from 1933), his brother-in-law, who founded Iyengar Yoga, with its first centre in Britain. Together they made yoga popular as exercise and brought it to the Western world. Iyengar's 1966 book Light on Yoga popularised yoga asanas worldwide with what the scholar-practitioner Norman Sjoman calls its "clear no-nonsense descriptions and the obvious refinement of the illustrations", though the degree of precision it calls for is missing from earlier yoga texts.

Other Indian schools of yoga took up the new style of asanas, but continued to emphasize Haṭha yoga's spiritual goals and practices to varying extents. The Divine Life Society was founded by Sivananda Saraswati of Rishikesh in 1936. His many disciples include Swami Vishnudevananda, who founded the International Sivananda Yoga Vedanta Centres, starting in 1959; Swami Satyananda of the Bihar School of Yoga, a major centre of Haṭha yoga teacher training, founded in 1963; and Swami Satchidananda of Integral Yoga, founded in 1966. Vishnudevananda published his Complete Illustrated Book of Yoga in 1960, with a list of asanas that substantially overlaps with Iyengar's, sometimes with different names for the same poses. (Note: The different names are sometimes closely connected. For example, Vishnudevananda's Anjaneyasana 2 is Iyengar's Hanumanasana; Anjani is Hanuman's mother, and Anjaneya is a matronymic for Hanuman.) Jois's asana names almost exactly match Iyengar's.

Influences on yoga as exercise include bodybuilding and gymnastics for men and women from Europe, alongside haṭha yoga and traditional exercises from India.

=== Worldwide commodity ===
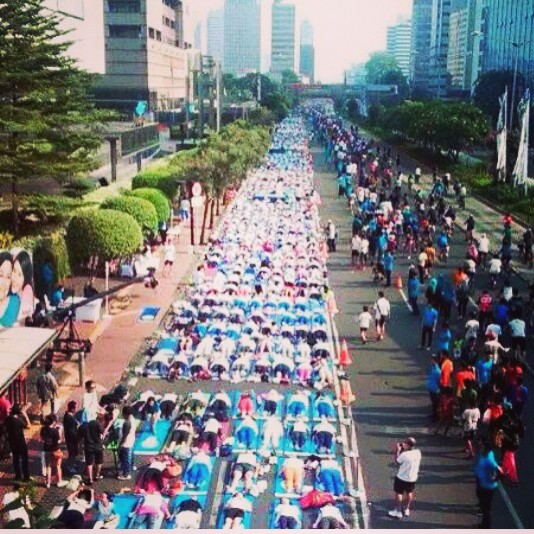
Yoga in public, Jakarta, 2013. The participants are relaxing in Shavasana.

Three changes around the 1960s allowed yoga as exercise to become a worldwide commodity. People were for the first time able to travel freely around the world: consumers could go to the east; Indians could migrate to Europe and America; and business people and religious leaders could go where they liked to sell their wares. Secondly, people across the Western world became disillusioned with organised religion, and started to look for alternatives. And thirdly, yoga became an uncontroversial form of exercise suitable for mass consumption, unlike the more religious or meditational forms of modern yoga such as Siddha Yoga or Transcendental Meditation. This involved the dropping of many traditional requirements on the practice of yoga, such as giving alms, being celibate, studying the Hindu scriptures, and retreating from society.

From the 1970s, yoga as exercise spread across many countries of the world, changing as it did so, and becoming "an integral part of (primarily) urban cultures worldwide", to the extent that the word yoga in the Western world now means the practice of asanas, typically in a class. (Note: The yoga scholar De Michelis notes that to speakers of Indic languages, yoga has a "quite different" semantic range, including meditation, prayer, ritual and devotional practices, ethical behaviour, and "secret esoteric techniques" that average English speakers would not consider to be yoga.) For example, Iyengar Yoga reached South Africa in 1979 with the opening of its institute at Pietermaritzburg; its Association of South East & East Asia was founded in 2009. The spread of yoga in America was assisted by the television show Lilias, Yoga and You, hosted by Lilias Folan; it ran from 1970 to 1999. In Australia, by 2005 some 12% of the population practised yoga in a class or at home. As a valuable business, yoga has in turn been used in advertising, sometimes for yoga-related products, sometimes for other goods and services.

The market for yoga grew, argues the scholar of religion Andrea Jain, with the creation of an "endless" variety of second-generation yoga brands, saleable products, "constructed and marketed for immediate consumption", based on earlier developments. For example, in 1997 John Friend, once a financial analyst, who had intensively studied both the postural Iyengar Yoga and the non-postural Siddha Yoga, founded Anusara Yoga. Friend likened the choice of his yoga over other brands to choosing "a fine restaurant" over "a fast-food joint." The New York Times Magazine headed its piece on him "The Yoga Mogul", while the historian of yoga Stefanie Syman argued that Friend had "very self-consciously" created his own yoga community. For example, Friend published his own teacher training manual, held workshops, conferences, and festivals, marketed his own brand of yoga mats and water bottles, and prescribed ethical guidelines. When Friend did not live up to the brand's high standards, he apologised publicly and took steps to protect the brand, in 2012 stepping back from running it and appointing a CEO.

Jain states that yoga is becoming "part of the pop culture around the world". Alter writes that it illustrates "transnational transmutation and the blurring of consumerism, holistic health, and embodied mysticism—as well as good old-fashioned Orientalism." Singleton argues that the commodity is the yoga body itself, its "spiritual possibility" signified by the "lucent skin of the yoga model", a beautiful image endlessly sold back to the yoga-practising public "as an irresistible commodity of the holistic, perfectible self".

In 2008, the United States Department of Health and Human Services labelled September as National Yoga Month. From 2015, at the suggestion of India's Prime Minister, Narendra Modi, an annual International Day of Yoga has been held on 21 June.

=== Transformation ===
The aims and practice of traditional and current yoga differ dramatically.

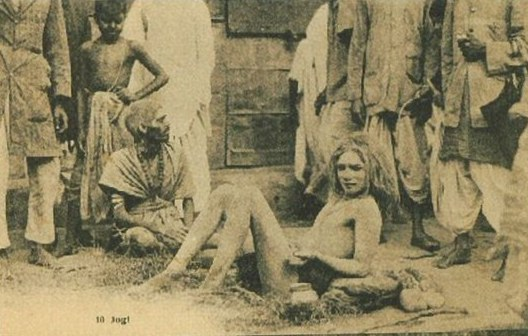
Traditional yoga in India: "naked yogis ... their skin smeared with ashes from the cremation pyre"

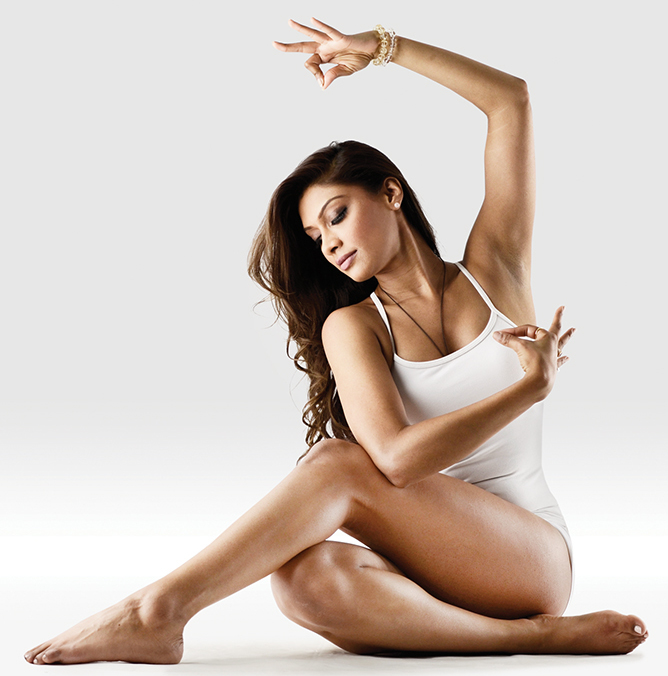
Yoga as exercise: the yoga body's "spiritual possibility" is signified by the "lucent skin of the yoga model".

The anthropologist Sarah Strauss contrasts the goal of classical yoga, the isolation of the self or kaivalya, with the modern goals of good health, reduced stress, and physical flexibility. Sjoman notes that many of the asanas in Iyengar's Light on Yoga can be traced to his teacher, Krishnamacharya, "but not beyond him". Singleton states that yoga used as exercise is not "the outcome of a direct and unbroken lineage of haṭha yoga", but it would be "going too far to say that modern postural yoga has no relationship to asana practice within the Indian tradition." The contemporary yoga practice is the result of "radical innovation and experimentation" of its Indian heritage. Jain writes that equating yoga as exercise with hatha yoga "does not account for the historical sources": asanas "only became prominent in modern yoga in the early twentieth century as a result of the dialogical exchanges between Indian reformers and nationalists and Americans and Europeans interested in health and fitness". In short, Jain writes, "modern yoga systems ... bear little resemblance to the yoga systems that preceded them. This is because [both] ... are specific to their own social contexts." The historian Jared Farmer writes that twelve trends have characterised yoga's progression from the 1890s onwards: from peripheral to central in society; from India to global; from male to "predominantly" female; from spiritual to "mostly" secular; from sectarian to universal; from mendicant to consumerist; from meditational to postural; from being understood intellectually to experientially; from embodying esoteric knowledge to being accessible to all; from being taught orally to hands-on instruction; from presenting poses in text to using photographs; and from being "contorted social pariahs" to "lithe social winners". The trend away from authority is continued in post-lineage yoga, which is practised outside any major school or guru's lineage.

The 20th century transformation of yoga
Aspect	Medieval Haṭha yoga	Yoga as exercise
Place in society	Peripheral	Central
Geography	Local, in India	Global
Gender	Male	"Predominantly" female
Spirituality	Goal of liberation	"Mostly" secular
Availability	Sectarian, e.g. Nath yogis	Universal
Attitude to money	Mendicant, renouncing property	Consumerist
Activity	Meditational	Postural
Method of appreciation	Intellectual	Experiential
Knowledge	Esoteric	Accessible
Teaching method	Oral	Hands-on
Representation of poses	Textual	Photographic
Social status	"Contorted social pariahs"	"Lithe social winners"

== Practices ==
=== Asanas ===
Yoga as exercise consists largely but not exclusively of the practice of asanas. The numbers of asanas described (not just named) in some major Haṭha yoga and modern texts are shown in the table; all the Haṭha yoga text dates are approximate.

Estimates of the number of asanas
No. of asanas	Text	Date	Evidence supplied
2	Goraksha Shataka	10th-11th century	Describes Siddhasana, Padmasana; a "symbolic" (Note: 84's symbolism may, according to Richard Rosen, citing S. Dasgupta, Gudrun Bühnemann, and John Campbell Onan, derive from its astrological and numerological properties: it is the product of 7, the number of planets in astrology, and 12, the number of signs of the zodiac, while in numerology, 7 is the sum of 3 and 4, and 12 is the product, i.e. 84 is (3+4)×(3×4).) 84 claimed
4	Shiva Samhita	15th century	4 seated asanas described, 84 claimed; 11 mudras
15	Hatha Yoga Pradipika	15th century	15 asanas described, 4 (Siddhasana, Padmasana, Bhadrasana and Simhasana) named as important
32	Gheranda Samhita	17th century	Descriptions of 32 seated, backbend, twist, balancing and inverted asanas, 25 mudras.
52	Hatha Ratnavali	17th century	52 asanas described, out of 84 named (Note: 84 names of asanas are listed; not all can now be identified.)
84	Joga Pradipika	1830	84 asanas and 24 mudras in rare illustrated edition of 18th-century text
37	Yoga Sopana	1905	Describes and illustrates with halftone plates 37 asanas, 6 mudras, 5 bandhas
~200	Light on Yoga; B. K. S. Iyengar	1966	Detailed descriptions and multiple photographs of each asana
908	Master Yoga Chart; Dharma Mittra	1984	Photographs of each asana
2100	2,100 Asanas; Mr. Yoga	2015	Photographs of each asana

Asanas can be classified in different ways, which may overlap: for example, by the position of the head and feet (standing, sitting, reclining, inverted), by whether balancing is required, or by the effect on the spine (forward bend, backbend, twist), giving a set of asana types agreed by most authors. The yoga guru Dharma Mittra uses his own categories such as "Floor & Supine Poses". Yogapedia and Yoga Journal add "Hip-opening"; the yoga teacher Darren Rhodes, Yogapedia and Yoga Journal also add "Core strength".

=== Styles ===
The number of schools and styles of yoga in the Western world has continued to grow rapidly. By 2012, there were at least 19 widespread styles from Ashtanga Yoga to Viniyoga. These emphasise different aspects including aerobic exercise, precision in the asanas, and spirituality in the Haṭha yoga tradition.

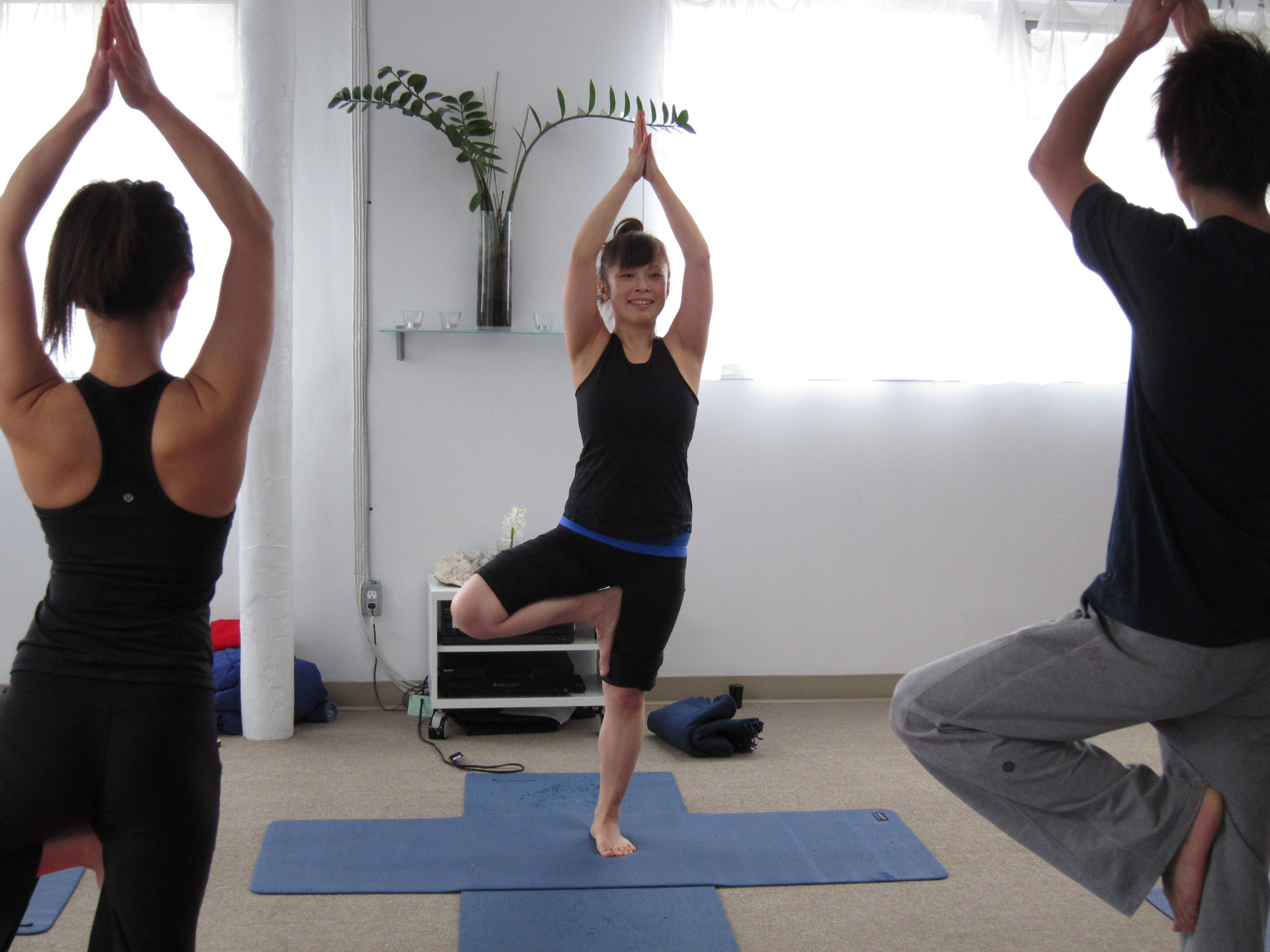
An unbranded "hatha yoga" class practising Vrikshasana, tree pose, in Vancouver, Canada

These aspects can be illustrated by schools with distinctive styles. For example, Bikram Yoga has an aerobic exercise style with rooms heated to 105 °F (41 °C) and a fixed pattern of 2 breathing exercises and 24 asanas. Iyengar Yoga emphasises correct alignment in the postures, working slowly, if necessary with props, and ending with relaxation. Sivananda Yoga focuses more on spiritual practice, with 12 basic poses, chanting in Sanskrit, pranayama breathing exercises, meditation, and relaxation in each class, and importance is placed on vegetarian diet. Jivamukti Yoga uses a flowing vinyasa style of asanas accompanied by music, chanting, and the reading of scriptures. Kundalini yoga emphasises the awakening of kundalini energy through meditation, pranayama, chanting, and suitable asanas.

Alongside the yoga brands, many teachers, for example in England, offer an unbranded "hatha yoga", (Note: Not to be confused with medieval Haṭha yoga) often mainly to women, creating their own combinations of poses. These may be in flowing sequences (vinyasas), and new variants of poses are often created. The gender imbalance has sometimes been marked; in Britain in the 1970s, women formed between 70 and 90 percent of most yoga classes, as well as most of the yoga teachers.

The tradition begun by Krishnamacharya survives at the Krishnamacharya Yoga Mandiram in Chennai; his son T. K. V. Desikachar and his grandson Kausthub Desikachar continued to teach in small groups, coordinating asana movements with the breath, and personalising the teaching according to the needs of individual students.

=== Sessions ===
Trikonasana is practised in Iyengar yoga with emphasis on correctness, sometimes as here using props such as yoga bricks.

Yoga sessions vary widely depending on the school and style, and according to how advanced the class is. As with any exercise class, sessions usually start slowly with gentle warm-up exercises, move on to more vigorous exercises, and slow down again towards the end. A beginners' class can begin with simple poses like Sukhasana, some rounds of Surya Namaskar, and then a combination of standing poses such as Trikonasana, sitting poses like Dandasana, and balancing poses like Navasana; it may end with some reclining and inverted poses like Setu Bandha Sarvangasana and Viparita Karani, a reclining twist, and finally Savasana for relaxation and in some styles also for a guided meditation. A typical session in most styles lasts from an hour to an hour and a half, whereas in Mysore style yoga, the class is scheduled in a three-hour time window during which the students practice on their own at their own speed, following individualised instruction by the teacher.

=== Hybrids ===
The evolution of yoga as exercise is not confined to the creation of new asanas and linking vinyasa sequences. A wide variety of hybrid activities combining yoga with martial arts, aerial yoga combined with acrobatics, yoga with barre work (as in ballet preparation), on horseback, with dogs, with goats, with ring-tailed lemurs, with weights, and on paddleboards are all being explored.

== Purposes ==
=== Exercise ===
The energy cost of exercise is measured in units of metabolic equivalent of task (MET). Less than 3 METs counts as light exercise; 3 to 6 METs is moderate; 6 or over is vigorous. American College of Sports Medicine and American Heart Association guidelines count periods of at least 10 minutes of moderate MET level activity towards their recommended daily amounts of exercise. For healthy adults aged 18 to 65, the guidelines recommend moderate exercise for 30 minutes five days a week, or vigorous aerobic exercise for 20 minutes three days a week.

Treated as a form of exercise, a complete yoga session with asanas and pranayama provides 3.3 ± 1.6 METs, on average a moderate workout. Surya Namaskar ranged from a light 2.9 to a vigorous 7.4 METs; (Note: Haskell, curious about the wide range of METs in Surya Namaskar, repeated the study (Mody) which gave the highest value; using "transition jumps, and full pushups", he obtained "agreement" with 6.4 METs.) the average for a session of yoga practice without Surya Namaskar was a light 2.9 ± 0.8 METs. (Note: Asanas performed individually provide on average 2.2 ± 0.7 METs; pranayama types performed individually provide just 1.3 ± 0.3 METs.)

=== Health ===
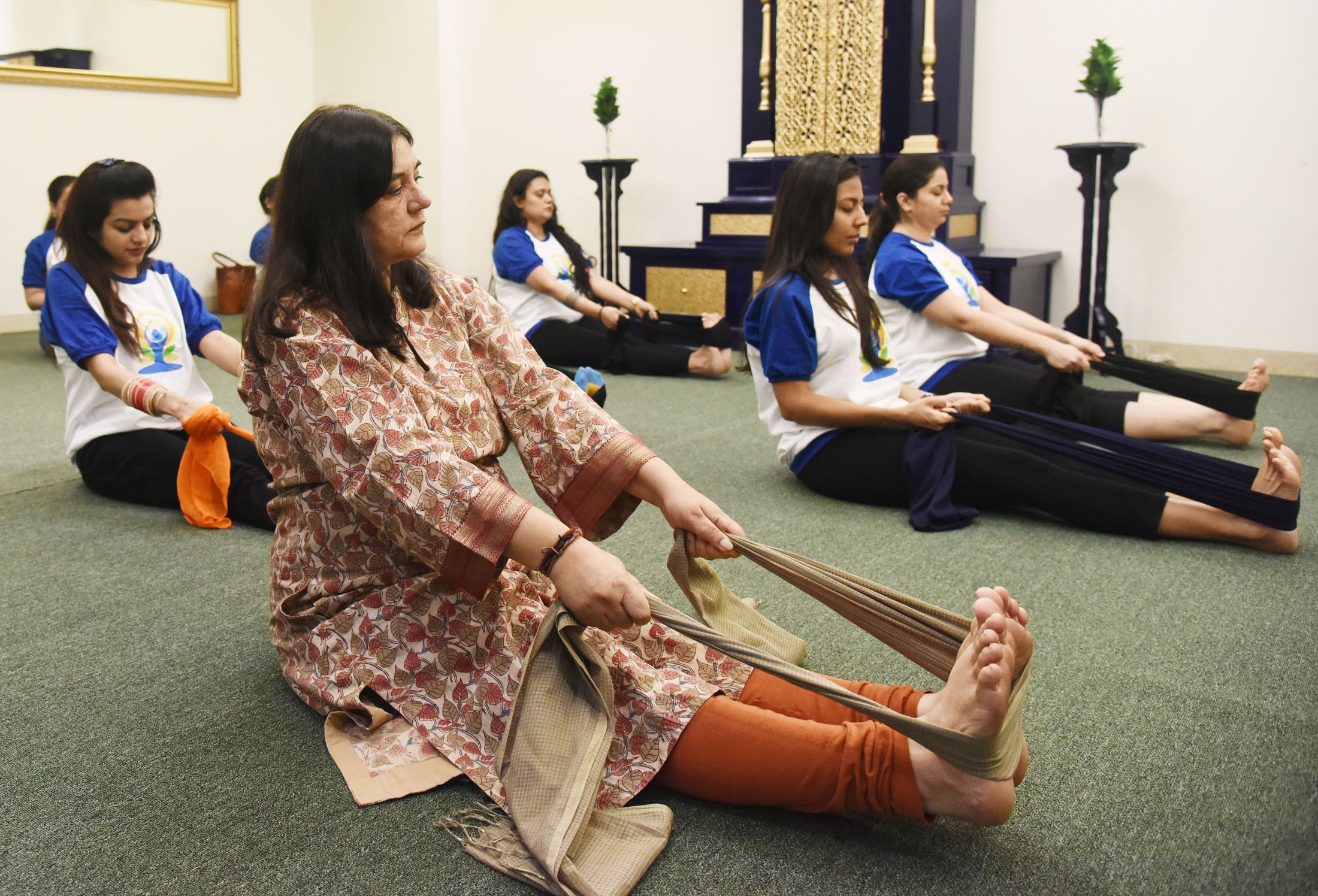
The Indian Minister for Women and Child Development, Maneka Gandhi, joining a programme of yoga for pregnant women in 2018. She is sitting in Dandasana, staff pose.

Yoga as exercise has been popularized in the Western world by claims about its health benefits. The history of such claims was reviewed by William J. Broad in his 2012 book The Science of Yoga; he states that the claims that yoga was scientific began as Hindu nationalist posturing. Among the early exponents was Kuvalayananda, who attempted to demonstrate scientifically in his purpose-built 1924 laboratory at Kaivalyadhama that Sarvangasana (shoulderstand) specifically rehabilitated the endocrine glands (the organs that secrete hormones). He found no evidence to support such a claim, for this or any other asana.

The impact of yoga as exercise on physical and mental health has been a topic of systematic studies (evaluating primary research), although a 2014 report found that, despite its common practice and possible health benefits, it remained "extremely understudied." A systematic review of six studies found that Iyengar yoga is effective at least in the short term for both neck pain and low back pain. A review of six studies found benefits for depression, but noted that the studies' methods imposed limitations, while a clinical practice guideline from the American Cancer Society stated that yoga may reduce anxiety and stress in people with cancer. A 2015 systematic review called for more rigour in clinical trials of the effect of yoga on mood and measures of stress.

The practice of asanas has been claimed to improve flexibility, strength, and balance; to alleviate stress and anxiety, and to reduce the symptoms of lower back pain. A review of five studies noted that three psychological (positive affect, mindfulness, self-compassion) and four biological mechanisms (posterior hypothalamus, interleukin-6, C-reactive protein and cortisol) that might act on stress had been examined empirically, whereas many other potential mechanisms remained to be studied; four of the mechanisms (positive affect, self-compassion, inhibition of the posterior hypothalamus and salivary cortisol) were found to mediate the potential stress-lowering effects of yoga. A 2017 review found moderate-quality evidence that yoga reduces back pain. For people with cancer, yoga may help relieve fatigue, improve psychological outcomes, and support sleep quality and life attitudes, although results vary from reviews published in 2017.

A 2015 systematic review noted that yoga may be effective in alleviating symptoms of prenatal depression. There is evidence that practice of asanas improves birth outcomes, physical health, anxiety and worry in older adults, quality of life measures in the elderly, whilst also reducing hypertension.

=== Secular religion ===
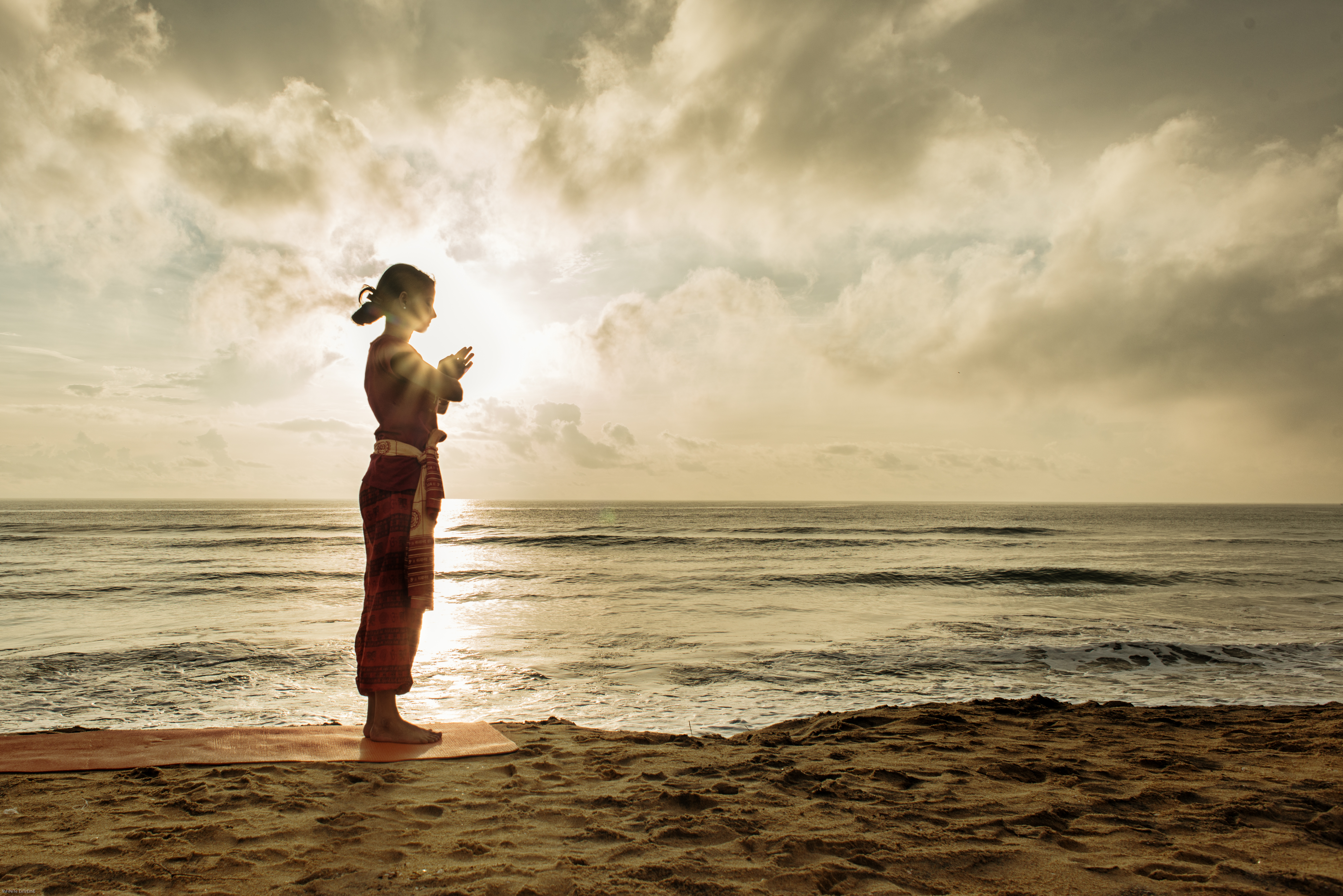
A personal yoga ritual

From its origins in the 1920s, yoga as exercise has had a "spiritual" aspect which is only partly neo-Hindu. Jain calls yoga as exercise "a sacred fitness regimen set apart from day-to-day life." The yoga therapist Ann Swanson writes that "scientific principles and evidence have demystified [yoga]" without making its practice less enjoyable. Yoga practice sessions have the specific three-part ritual structure as described Arnold van Gennep: a separation phase (detaching from the world outside, going into the yoga space); a transition or liminal state (instructed by the teacher, remaining receptive and silent); and an incorporation or postliminal state (relaxing in Savasana, withdrawing the senses, even a symbolic death and self-renewal, moving towards the Atma or real self). Some practitioners use asanas as a means of transcendence." In mindful yoga, the practice of asanas is combined with pranayama and meditation, using the breath and sometimes Buddhist Vipassana meditation techniques to quieten the mind. Practitioners can perceive yoga as exercise as separate from religion, though Hindu symbols and religious concepts, words, and chanting are often used in classes. Western yoga spaces look somewhat Indian, are clean, and peaceful, and include individuals with extreme physical abilities.

== Issues ==
=== Physical or Hindu ===
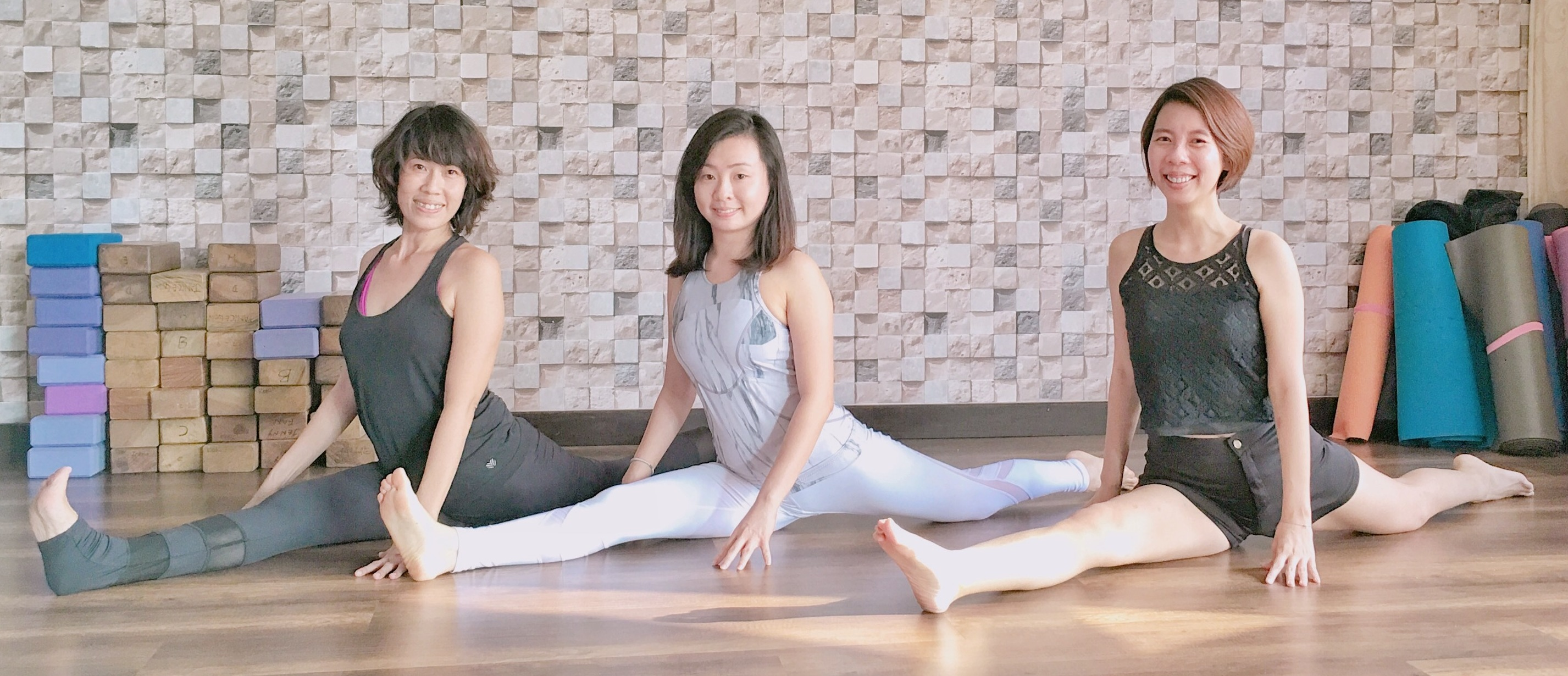
Yoga (here Hanumanasana) is permitted in Malaysia as long as it does not contain religious elements.

Yoga in the Western world has served as physical exercise, rather than any "overtly Hindu" purpose. In 2010, the question was publicly debated. Saffronising Indian-Americans campaigned to "Take Back Yoga" by informing Americans about yoga's Hindu connection. The campaign was criticised by New Age author Deepak Chopra, but supported by the president of the Southern Baptist Theological Seminary, R. Albert Mohler Jr. Jain notes that yoga can be Jain or Buddhist, and is neither homogeneous nor static, so she is critical of both the "Christian yogaphobic position" and the "Hindu origins position." Farmer writes that Syman identifies a Protestant streak in yoga as exercise, its effortfulness "paradoxically, both 'an indulgence and a penance'." Authorities differ on whether yoga is purely exercise; in 2012, New York state decided that yoga was exempt from state sales tax as it was not "true exercise", whereas in 2014 the District of Columbia subjected yoga premises to its sales tax.

Similar debates have taken place in a Muslim context: restrictions on yoga have been lifted in Saudi Arabia; while in Malaysia, Kuala Lumpur permits yoga provided there is no chanting or meditation. Yoga teacher Mira Mehta stated in 2010 that her students' spiritual lives were a private matter, not her concern. Kimberley J. Pingatore found that American yoga practitioners did not view the categories of religious, spiritual, and secular as alternatives. However, Syman comments, Haṭha yoga's "ecstatic ... transcendent ... possibly subversive" elements remain in yoga as exercise. The yoga teacher and author Jessamyn Stanley writes that Western society "does not respect the esoteric or spiritual at all", making people skeptical about any connection with "chakras or spirituality". Stanley notes that styles such as Bikram do not mention spirituality, but that practice brings "an overall evolution of the self." Syman suggests that the attraction of Bikram and Ashtanga Yoga is that under the physical exertion is a hard-won ecstasy that feels deserved. That context has led to a division of opinion among Christians, some like Alexandra Davis of the Evangelical Alliance asserting that yoga is acceptable as long as its origins are clear, whereas Paul Gosbee argues that yoga's purpose is to "open up chakras" and release kundalini or "serpent power" which he believes is "from Satan", making "Christian yoga ... a contradiction."

=== Competitive activity ===
The idea of yoga as a competitive activity has been called an oxymoron and antithetical to its philosopy by some people in the yoga community, such as the yoga teacher Maja Sidebaeck, but the fiercely contested Bishnu Charan Ghosh Cup, founded by Bikram Choudhury in 2003, is now held annually in Los Angeles.

=== Cultural appropriation ===
In a secular context, the journalists Nell Frizzell and Reni Eddo-Lodge have debated (in The Guardian) whether Western yoga classes represent "cultural appropriation." In Frizzell's view, yoga has become a new entity, a long way from the Yoga Sutras of Patanjali, and while some practitioners are culturally insensitive, others treat it with more respect. Eddo-Lodge agrees that Western yoga is far from Patanjali, but argues that the changes cannot be undone, whether people use it "as a holier-than-thou tool, as a tactic to balance out excessive drug use, or practised similarly to its origins with the spirituality that comes with it." Jain argues however that charges of appropriation "from 'the East' to 'the West'" fail to take account of the fact that yoga is evolving in a shared multinational process; it is not something that is being stolen from one place by another.

== Business ==
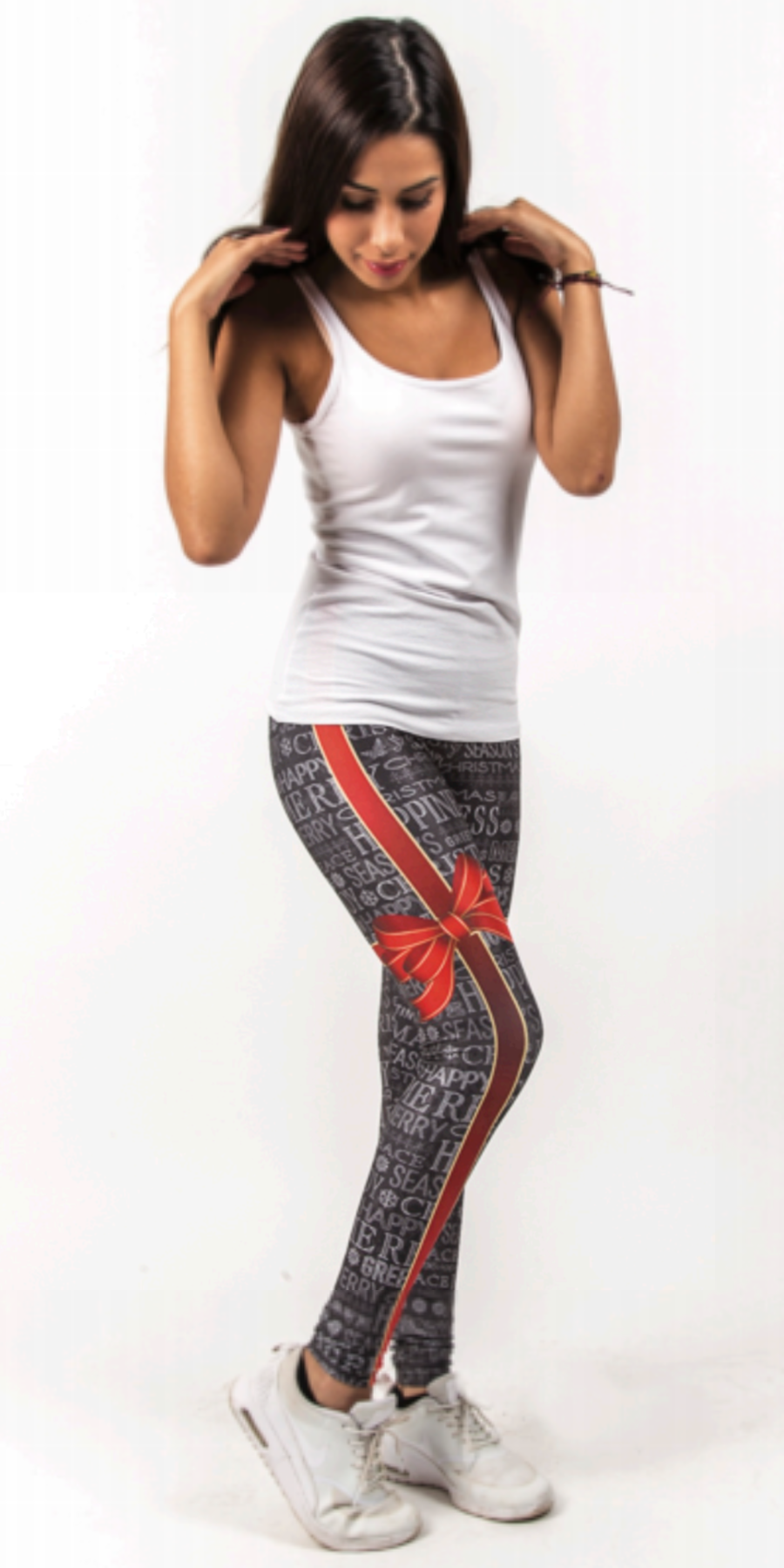
Fashion leggings (yoga pants) have become big business.

By the 21st century, yoga as exercise had become a flourishing business, professionally marketed. A 2016 Ipsos study reported that 36.7 million Americans practise yoga, making the business of classes, clothing and equipment worth $16 billion in America, compared to $10 billion in 2012, and $80 billion worldwide. 72 percent of practitioners were women. By 2010, Yoga Journal, founded in 1975, had some 350,000 subscribers and over 1,300,000 readers.

=== Clothing and equipment ===
Fashion has entered the world of yoga, with brands such as Lorna Jane and Lululemon offering their own ranges of women's yoga clothing. Sales of goods such as yoga mats are increasing rapidly; sales were projected to rise to $14 billion by 2020 in North America, where the key vendors in 2016 were Barefoot Yoga, Gaiam, Jade Yoga, and Manduka, according to Technavio. Sales of athleisure clothing such as yoga pants were worth $35 billion in 2014, forming 17% of American clothing sales. A wide variety of instructional videos are available, some free. Yoga has reached high fashion, too: in 2011, the fashion house Gucci, noting the "halo of chic" around yoga-practising celebrities such as Madonna and Sting, produced a yoga mat costing $850 and a matching carry case in leather for $350.

In India, participants typically wear loose-fitting clothes for yoga classes, while serious practitioners in yoga ashrams practice an arduous combination of exercise, meditation, selfless service, vegetarian diet and celibacy, making yoga a way of life.

=== Holidays and training ===
Yoga holidays (vacations) are offered in "idyllic" places around the world, including in Croatia, England, France, Greece, Iceland, Indonesia, India, Italy, Montenegro, Morocco, Portugal, Romania, Spain, Sri Lanka, Thailand, and Turkey. In 2018, prices were up to £1,295 (about $1,500) for 6 days.

Teacher training, as of 2017, could cost between $2,000 and $5,000. It can take up to 3 years to obtain a teaching certificate. Yoga training courses, as of 2017, were still unregulated in the UK; the British Wheel of Yoga has been appointed the activity's official governing body by Sport England, but it lacks power to compel training organisations, and many people are taking short unaccredited courses rather than any of the nine courses so far accredited.

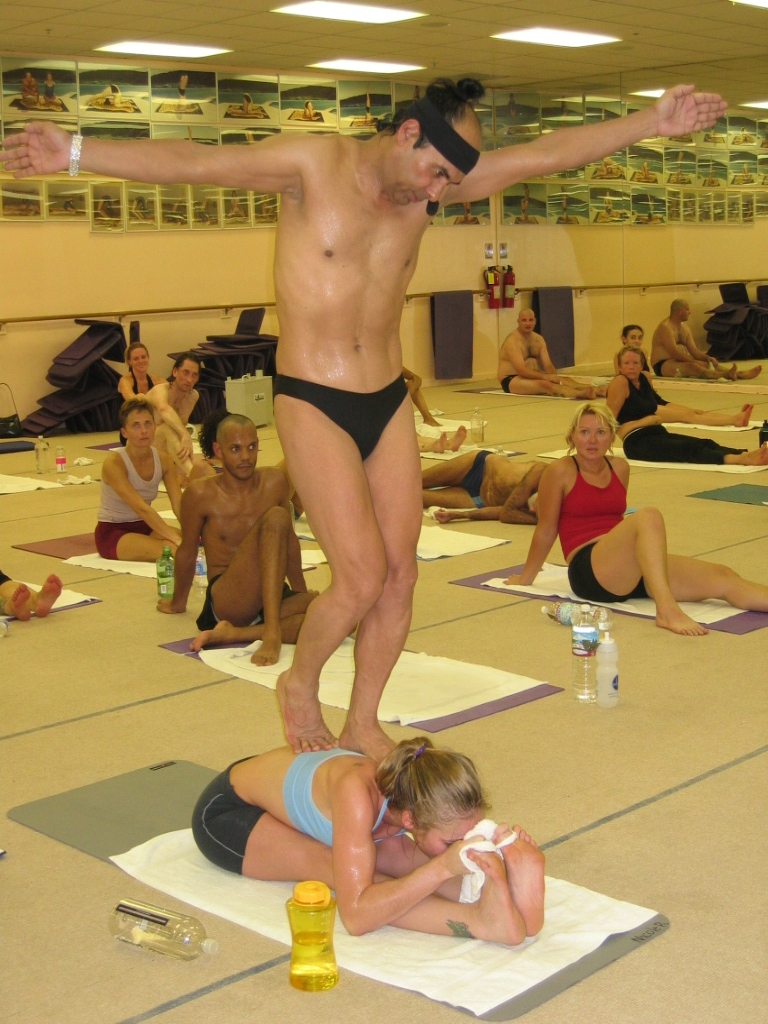
Bikram Choudhury teaching a Bikram Yoga class

=== Copyright claims ===
Bikram Yoga has become a global brand, and its founder, Bikram Choudhury, spent some ten years from 2002 attempting to establish copyright on the sequence of 26 postures used in Bikram Yoga, with some initial success. However, in 2012, the American federal court ruled that Bikram Yoga could not be copyrighted. In 2015, after further legal action, the American court of appeals ruled that the yoga sequence and breathing exercises were not eligible for copyright protection.

== In culture ==
=== Literature ===
Yoga has found its way into types of literature as varied as autobiography, chick lit, and documentary. The actress Mariel Hemingway's 2002 autobiography Finding My Balance: A Memoir with Yoga describes how she used yoga to recover balance in her life after a dysfunctional upbringing: among other things, her grandfather, the novelist Ernest Hemingway, killed himself shortly before she was born. Each chapter is titled after an asana, the first being "Mountain Pose, or Tadasana", the posture of standing in balance. The teacher of yoga and mindful meditation Anne Cushman's 2009 novel Enlightenment for Idiots tells the story of a woman nearing the age of thirty whose life as a nanny and yogini hopeful is not working out as expected, and is sure that a visit to the ashrams of India will sort out her life. Instead, she finds that nothing in India is quite what it seems on the surface. The Yoga Journal review notes that underneath the chick lit "fun romp", the book is a serious "call to enlightenment and an introduction to yoga philosophy."

Kate Churchill's 2009 film Enlighten Up! follows an unemployed journalist for six months as, on the filmmaker's invitation, he travels the world to practise under yoga masters including Jois, Norman Allen, (Note: Allen was the first American to be taught by Jois.) and Iyengar. The critic Roger Ebert found it interesting and peaceful, if "not terribly eventful, but I suppose we wouldn't want a yoga thriller"."

=== Research ===
Yoga has become a subject of academic inquiry; many of the researchers are "scholar practitioners" who do yoga themselves. Medknow (part of Wolters Kluwer), with Swami Vivekananda Yoga Anusandhana Samsthana university, publishes the peer-reviewed open access medical journal International Journal of Yoga. An increasing number of papers are being published on the possible medical benefits of yoga, such as on stress and low back pain. The School of Oriental and African Studies in London has created a Centre of Yoga Studies; it hosted the five-year Hatha Yoga Project which traced the history of physical yoga, and it teaches a master's degree in yoga and meditation.

Academics have given yoga as exercise a variety of names, including "modern postural yoga" reflecting its emphasis on asanas (postures) and "transnational anglophone yoga" denoting its growth in the English-speaking world, especially America.

== Sources ==
- Ahlstrom, Sydney (1972). A Religious History of the American People. Yale University Press.
- Alter, Joseph (2004). Yoga in Modern India: the body between science and philosophy. Princeton University Press. ISBN 978-0-691-11874-1.
- Bramadat, Paul (15 April 2025). Yogalands. Montreal: McGill-Queen's University Press. ISBN 978-0-2280-2374-6.
- Broad, William J. (2012). The Science of Yoga: The Risks and the Rewards. Simon & Schuster. ISBN 978-1-4516-4142-4.
- Bühnemann, Gudrun (2007). Eighty-Four Asanas in Yoga: A Survey of Traditions. New Delhi: DK. ISBN 978-81-246-0417-5.
- Bukh, Niels (2010) [1924]. Primary Gymnastics. Tufts Press. ISBN 978-1-4465-2735-1.
- Caycedo, Alfonso (1966). India of Yogis. National Publishing House, University of Michigan.
- Cushman, Anne (2009). Enlightenment for Idiots. Random House. ISBN 978-0-307-38165-1.
- ——— (2014). Moving into Meditation. Shambhala. ISBN 978-1-61180-098-2.
- De Michelis, Elizabeth (2004). A History of Modern Yoga: Patañjali and Western Esotericism. Continuum International Publishing Group. ISBN 978-0-8264-8772-8. OCLC 51942410.
- Devi, Indra (1953). Forever Young, Forever Healthy:Simplified Yoga for Modern Living. Prentice-Hall. OCLC 652377847.
- Foxen, Anya P. (2020). Inhaling Spirit: Harmonialism, Orientalism, and the Western Roots of Modern Yoga. Oxford University Press. ISBN 978-0-19-008274-1.
- Gates, Janice (2006). Yogini: Women Visionaries of the Yoga World. Mandala. ISBN 978-1-932771-88-6.
- Goldberg, Elliott (2016). The Path of Modern Yoga: the history of an embodied spiritual practice. Inner Traditions. ISBN 978-1-62055-567-5. OCLC 926062252.
- Gowing, Elizabeth (2019). Unlikely Positions (in Unlikely Places): a Yoga Journey Around Britain. England: Bradt Travel Guides. ISBN 978-1-78477-640-4. OCLC 1061309216.
- Hemingway, Mariel (2004) [2002]. Finding My Balance: A Memoir with Yoga. Simon & Schuster. ISBN 978-0-7432-6432-7.
- Iyengar, B. K. S. (1979) [1966]. Light on Yoga: Yoga Dipika. Unwin Paperbacks. ISBN 978-1-85538-166-7.
- ——— (1983). Light on Pranayama: Pranayama Dipika. Unwin Paperbacks.
- ——— (2006). Light on Life: The Yoga Journey to Wholeness, Inner Peace, and Ultimate Freedom. Rodale. ISBN 978-1-59486-524-4.
- Jain, Andrea (2015). Selling Yoga: from Counterculture to Pop culture. Oxford University Press. ISBN 978-0-19-939024-3. OCLC 878953765.
- Kevles, Daniel (1995). In the name of eugenics: genetics and the uses of human heredity. Harvard University Press. ISBN 978-0-674-44557-4. OCLC 32430452.
- Lidell, Lucy; The Sivananda Yoga Centre (1983). The Book of Yoga: the complete step-by-step guide. Ebury. ISBN 978-0-85223-297-2. OCLC 12457963.
- Mallinson, James (2011). Knut A. Jacobsen; et al. (eds.). Haṭha Yoga in the Brill Encyclopedia of Hinduism. Vol. 3. Brill Publishers. pp. 770–781. ISBN 978-90-04-27128-9.
- ——— Singleton, Mark (2017). Roots of Yoga. Penguin Books. ISBN 978-0-241-25304-5. OCLC 928480104.
- Mehta, Silva; Mehta, Mira; Mehta, Shyam (1990). Yoga: The Iyengar Way. Dorling-Kindersley. ISBN 978-0-86318-420-8.
- Mittra, Dharma (2003). Asanas: 608 Yoga Poses. New World Library. ISBN 978-1-57731-402-8.
- Mohan, A. G. (2010). Krishnamacharya: His Life and Teachings. Shambhala Publications. p. 11. ISBN 978-1-59030-800-4.
- Newcombe, Suzanne (2007). "Stretching for Health and Well-Being: Yoga and Women in Britain, 1960–1980". Asian Medicine. 3 (1): 37–63. doi:10.1163/157342107X207209. S2CID 72555878.
- ——— (2009). "The Development of Modern Yoga: A Survey of the Field". Religion Compass. 3 (6): 986–1002. doi:10.1111/j.1749-8171.2009.00171.x.
- ——— (2014). "The institutionalization of the yoga tradition: gurus B. K. S. Iyengar and Yogini Sunita in Britain". In Singleton, Mark; Goldberg, Ellen (eds.). Gurus of Modern Yoga. Oxford University Press. ISBN 978-0-19-993872-8. Archived from the original on 19 July 2018.
- ——— (2017). "The Revival of Yoga in Contemporary India" (PDF). In Barton, John (ed.). Oxford Research Encyclopedias: Religion. Oxford: Oxford University Press. doi:10.1093/acrefore/9780199340378.013.253. ISBN 978-0-19-934037-8. Archived (PDF) from the original on 5 September 2019.
- Pratinidhi, Bhawanrao Shrinivasrao Pant (1938) [1929]. Morgan, Louise (ed.). The Ten-Point Way to Health = Surya Namaskars. London: J. M. Dent. OCLC 156801198.
- Rhodes, Darren (2016). Yoga Resource Practice Manual. Tirtha Studios. ISBN 978-0-9836883-9-6.
- Saraswati, Swami Satyananda (1996). Asana Pranayama Mudra Bandha (PDF). Yoga Publications Trust. ISBN 978-81-86336-14-4. Archived (PDF) from the original on 22 August 2014.
- Scaravelli, Vanda (1991). Awakening the Spine. Harper. ISBN 978-0-06-242853-0. OCLC 907678659.
- Schneider, Carrie (2003). American Yoga: The Paths and Practices of America's Greatest Yoga Masters. Barnes & Noble. pp. 60–65. ISBN 0-7607-4558-7.
- Shearer, Alistair (2020). The Story of Yoga: from Ancient India to the Modern West. C. Hurst & Co. ISBN 978-1-78738-192-6. OCLC 1089012347.
- Singleton, Mark (2010). Yoga Body: the origins of modern posture practice. Oxford University Press. ISBN 978-0-19-539534-1. OCLC 318191988.
- ——— (2013). "Transnational Exchange and the Genesis of Modern Postural Yoga". In Beatrix Hauser (ed.). Yoga Traveling: Bodily Practice in Transcultural Perspective. Springer. ISBN 978-3-319-00315-3.
- Sjoman, Norman E. (1999) [1996]. The Yoga Tradition of the Mysore Palace (2nd ed.). Abhinav Publications. ISBN 81-7017-389-2.
- Srinivasa, Narinder (2002). Gharote, M. L.; Devnath, Parimal; Jha, Vijay Kant (eds.). Haṭharatnāvalī (a treatise on Haṭhayoga) of Śrīnivāsayogī (1st ed.). The Lonavla Yoga Institute. ISBN 81-901176-96.
- Strauss, Sarah (2005). Positioning Yoga: balancing acts across cultures. Berg. ISBN 978-1-85973-739-2. OCLC 290552174.
- Swanson, Ann (2019). Science of yoga: understand the anatomy and physiology to perfect your practice. New York, New York: DK. ISBN 978-1-4654-7935-8. OCLC 1030608283.
- Syman, Stefanie (2010). The Subtle Body: the Story of Yoga in America. Farrar, Straus and Giroux. ISBN 978-0-374-53284-0. OCLC 456171421.
- Tiruka (1977). Suryanamaskara (in Kannada). Malladhihalli: Sarvodaya Mudranalaya, Anathasevashrama Trust. p. v. OCLC 20519100.
- Van Gennep, Arnold (1965) [1908]. The Rites of Passage. Routledge & Kegan Paul. OCLC 752944237.
- Veenhof, Douglas (2011). White Lama: The Life of Tantric Yogi Theos Bernard, Tibet's Emissary to the New World. Harmony Books. ISBN 978-0-385-51432-3.
- Vishnudevananda, Swami (1988) [1960]. The Complete Illustrated Book of Yoga. Three Rivers Press. ISBN 0-517-88431-3.
- Yogendra (1928). Yoga Asanas Simplified. The Yoga Institute. OCLC 58817499.
