= Positioning Yoga =

2005 book by Sarah Strauss

Positioning Yoga: balancing acts across cultures
- Author: Sarah Strauss
- Subject: Yoga as exercise
- Publisher: Berg Publishers
- Publication date: 2005
- Pages: 206
- OCLC: 290552174

Positioning Yoga: balancing acts across cultures is a 2005 book of social anthropology by Sarah Strauss about the history of modern yoga as exercise, focusing on the example of Sivananda Yoga.

== Context ==
Yoga as exercise is an international practice, specially widespread in the English-speaking world, using yoga postures (asanas) for fitness and health. Yoga originated in India, where it takes many forms, often entirely without the use of asanas.

Sarah Strauss is a professor of anthropology at Worcester Polytechnic Institute. She states that one of her "ongoing research goals is to understand how different cultures define what it means to be healthy and to live a 'good life'."

== Book ==
=== Synopsis ===
Yoga came from India, but how did it change from the solitary practice of Indian mystics to a Western urban method of exercise? Strauss tells the story of modern yoga, starting with Vivekananda's appearance at Chicago's 1893 Parliament of the World's Religions. She shows how yoga changed as it traversed between cultures and historical contexts. She examines in detail Sivananda of Rishikesh's Divine Life Society and its yoga practitioners from different countries.

=== Publication history ===
Positioning Yoga was published in hardcover by Berg Publishers of Oxford and New York in 2005.

=== Illustrations ===
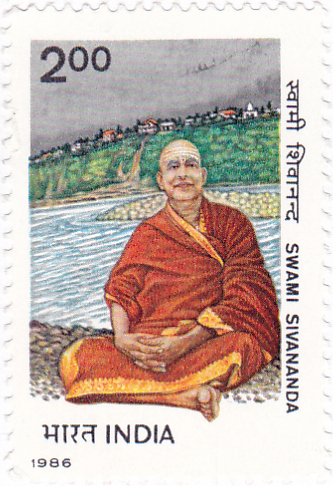
Sivananda seated by the sacred river Ganges at Rishikesh, on a 1986 200 Rs. postage stamp

The book is illustrated with 10 figures, mostly monochrome photographs by the author. One figure is an outline map of India, and another shows a 200 Rupee postage stamp commemorating Sivananda seated by the river Ganges at Rishikesh.

== Reception ==
The yoga scholar Mark Singleton describes the book as a "study of the 'transnational' yoga teachings of Swami Sivananda of Rishikesh", based on Strauss's fieldwork in India. He calls the book "less critically aware .. of modern yoga's dialectical relationship with tradition than either Alter or De Michelis."

The yoga scholar Suzanne Newcombe, in her account The Revival of Yoga in Contemporary India, writes that Strauss argues that "Sivananda's injunctions to 'Serve, Love, Meditate, Realise' roughly parallel Vivekananda's four paths of yoga."

The scholar of Hinduism Måns Broo notes that Strauss argues that "the practice of yoga is a quest for wellness—a combination of well-being and fitness—in order to reach an authentic Self, healthy in every sense of the word." Broo contrasts this with the early modern Romantic quest for self-development as an adult, stating that the yoga quest involves "a continual sense of self-making, with no end in sight." Broo notes also that Strauss "calls yoga a form of embodied knowledge, which no amount of reading can impart."

The scholar of religion Mark Eaton writes that Strauss's argument in the book depends on her concept of an "oasis regime", where yoga practitioners use yoga to "escape from the demands of their daily lives". In his view, seeing Sivananda yoga as an oasis is "certainly an optimistic perspective".

The anthropologist Thomas Hauschild reviewed the book for Current Anthropology, noting that before it and Joseph Alter's 2004 Yoga in Modern India there had been a "striking" absence of detailed studies of "non-Western movements" such as modern yoga.

The anthropologist Olga Demetriou reviewed Positioning Yoga for Social Anthropology.

== See also ==
- Joseph Alter, author of the 2004 Yoga in Modern India, one of the first books of yoga ethnography

== Sources ==
- Strauss, Sarah (2005). Positioning Yoga: balancing acts across cultures. Oxford and New York: Berg. ISBN 978-1-85973-739-2. OCLC 290552174.
