= Gudrun Bühnemann =

German academic

- Born: Germany
- Occupation: Indologist
- Website: http://buhnemann.ls.wisc.edu/

Gudrun Bühnemann is a professor in the Department of Asian Languages and Cultures at the University of Wisconsin, Madison. She is an Indologist whose research interests include Sanskrit language and literature, Buddhism, Hinduism, Tantrism and yoga studies. Her work has especially attracted the interest of scholars working on South Asian iconography and ritual and of scholars of the emerging discipline of Yoga Studies for her discovery of early illustrated manuscripts including the Joga Pradīpikā showing sets of 84 asanas.

== Life ==
Gudrun Bühnemann was born in Germany. She obtained her PhD in Classical Indian and Buddhist Studies at the University of Vienna. She spent extended periods of time as a post-doctoral researcher at Pune University in India and at Nagoya University and Kyoto University in Japan. Her research has been supported by fellowships from the National Endowment for the Humanities, the American Council of Learned Societies, the Japan Society for the Promotion of Science and the German Research Council, among other organizations. She has published numerous books on South Asian iconography and ritual. These often use material from previously unpublished manuscripts and from illustrated manuscripts. She is on the faculty of the University of Wisconsin, Madison.

== Reception ==
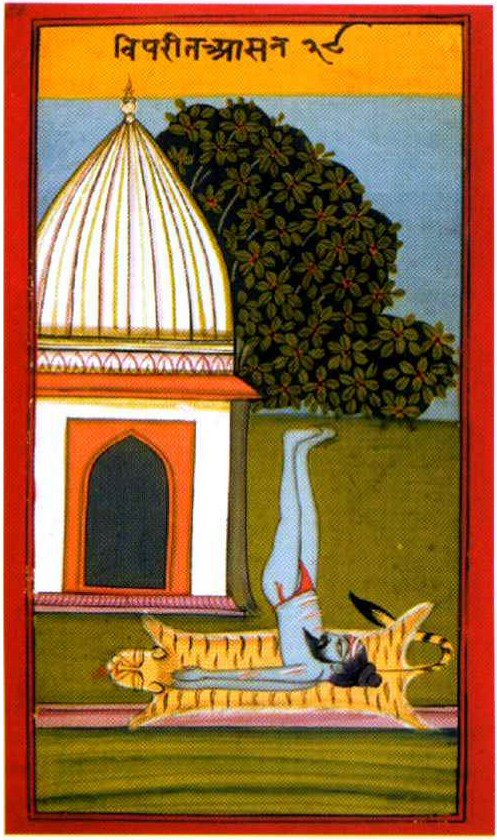
Viparīta Karaṇī from an 1830 manuscript with 84 illustrations of the Joga Pradīpikā, one of the texts discussed in Bühnemann's 2007 Eighty-Four Asanas in Yoga: A Survey of Traditions

Sanjukta Gupta, reviewing her edited collection Mandalas and Yantras in the Hindu Tradition, calls the book "a wonderfully designed volume of essays" and praises Bühnemann with the words "The editor, Professor Gudrun Bühnemann, has already published excellent works on Hindu gods, rituals and iconography. This is no exception."

Richard Rosen calls Bühnemann's Eighty-Four Asanas in Yoga "comprehensive", and notes that the number 84 signifies completeness and sometimes sacredness. Mark Singleton notes of the same work that Bühnemann demonstrated that asanas had been illustrated from very early in the modern period, for instance in the Joga Pradīpikā, and that her study showed that standing poses were largely missing from hatha yoga.

I. M. P. Raeside, reviewing her Puja: A Study in Smārta Ritual, calls it a very full study of the theory and practice of Puja in Hinduism, noting its value in describing three specific traditional pujas, countering in Raeside's view "trendy pujas, which have only tenuous connexions with earlier Hindu rites". He notes that Bühnemann "has benefited throughout from a lengthy residence in Poona from 1982 to 1985" where she attended and discussed "many of these ceremonies".

== Works/Books ==
- Publication list on website
- 1980 Der allwissende Buddha: Ein Beweis und seine Probleme. Ratnakīrtis Sarvajñasiddhi übersetzt und kommentiert
- 1982 Jitāri: Kleine Texte beschrieben und ediert (second edition, 1985)
- 1983 Budha-Kauśika's Rāmarakṣāstotra: A Contribution to the Study of Sanskrit Devotional Poetry (Marathi translation, 2007)
- 1986 Stotramālā, An die Götter: Eine Auswahl von Sanskrithymnen in deutscher Übersetzung (in German)
- 1988 Pūjā: A Study in Smārta Ritual
- 1988 The Worship of Mahāgaṇapati according to the Nityotsava (first Indian edition, 2003)
- 1989 Forms of Gaṇeśa: A Study based on the Vidyārṇavatantra(Indian revised edition, 2008: Tantric Forms of Gaṇeśa according to the Vidyārṇavatantra)
- 1990 The Hindu Deities Illustrated according to the Pratiṣṭhālakṣaṇasārasamuccaya (completely revised, 2003: The Hindu Pantheon in Nepalese Line Drawings)
- 1991 Niṣpannayogāvalī. Two Sanskrit Manuscripts from Nepal
- 1994 *Sādhanaśataka and *Sādhanaśatapañcāśikā. Two Buddhist Sādhana Collections in Sanskrit Manuscript
- 2000-2001 The Iconography of Hindu Tantric Deities (2nd edition, 2016)

Volume 1: The Pantheon of the Mantramahodadhi
Volume 2: The Pantheons of the Prapañcasāra and the Śāradātilaka

- 2003 Maṇḍalas and Yantras in the Hindu Traditions (revised edition, 2007)
- 2003 Buddhist Deities of Nepal: Iconography in Two Sketchbooks
- 2007 Eighty-Four Asanas in Yoga: A Survey of Traditions with Illustrations (second edition, 2011; Russian and Korean translations, 2009 and 2011)
- 2008 Buddhist Iconography and Ritual in Paintings and Line Drawings from Nepal
- 2011 Buddhism for Dummies (with J. Landaw and S. Bodian), second edition
- 2012 The Life of the Buddha: Buddhist and Śaiva Iconography and Visual Narratives in Artists' Sketchbooks from Nepal
- 2015 Śākyamuni's Return Journey to Lumbinī (lumbinīyātrā): A Study of a Popular Theme in Newar Buddhist Art and Literature

== Sources ==
- Rosen, Richard (2017). Yoga FAQ: Almost Everything You Need to Know about Yoga-from Asanas to Yamas. Shambhala Publications. ISBN 978-0-8348-4057-7.
- Singleton, Mark (2010). Yoga Body : the origins of modern posture practice. Oxford University Press. ISBN 978-0-19-539534-1. OCLC 318191988.
