= S. P. Nimbalkar =

Indian academic

- Born: 27 July 1926; Ahmednagar, Maharashtra, India
- Died: September 30, 2021 (aged 95); Navi Mumbai
- Occupation: Yoga Guru
- Known for: Yoga
- Spouse: Smt.Shakuntala Nimbalkar
- Children: 2 daughters
- Awards: Padma Shri
- Website: Website of Yoga Vidya Niketan

Sadashiv Prahlad Nimbalkar was an Indian academic, author, Yoga guru and the founder of Yoga Vidya Niketan (YVN), a Mumbai-based Yoga institute, promoting the practice of Yoga. A former physical education instructor and a vice principal of a junior college, Nimbalkar practiced Yoga under renowned teacher, Swami Kuvalayananda, one of the pioneers of Yoga research and the founder of Kaivalyadhama Yoga Institute. Yoga Vidya Niketan, the institute Nimbalkar founded, offers various courses such as Diploma in Yogic Science, Teachers Training Courses, Diploma in Yoga Therapy and Diploma in Natural Living and Naturopathy, for students and teachers.

Nimbalkar has written several articles and three books, Aarogyasathi Yoga, Pranayama and Swasthya Ke Liye Yoga He is a member of the Advisory Board of the Brihan Maharashtra Yoga Parishad and has delivered several practice sessions in India and the US. The Government of India awarded him the fourth highest civilian honour of the Padma Shri, in 2004, for his contributions towards popularizing Yoga.

== See also ==
- Swami Kuvalayananda
