= Swami Kuvalayananda =

Indian yoga guru (1883–1966)

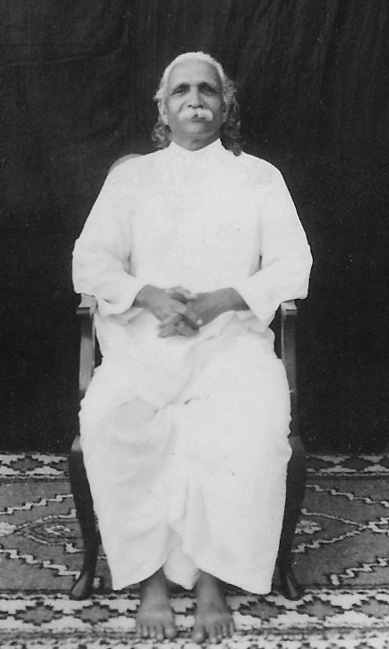
- c. 1960
- Born: Jagannatha Ganesa Gune; 30 August 1883; Dabhoi, Gujarat, India
- Died: 18 April 1966 (aged 82); Lonavala, Maharashtra, India
- Occupations: Scientific Researcher, Teacher, Yogi

Swami Kuvalayananda (born Jagannatha Ganesa Gune, 30 August 1883 – 18 April 1966) was a yoga guru, researcher, and educator primarily known for his pioneering research into the scientific foundations of yoga. He started research on yoga in 1920, and published the first journal specifically devoted to studying yoga, Yoga Mimamsa, in 1924. Most of his research took place at Kaivalyadhama, the centre at Lonavala which he founded in 1924. He has had a profound influence on the development of yoga as exercise.

== Early life ==
Swami Kuvalayananda was born Jagannatha Ganesa Gune in a traditional Karhade Brahmin family in the village Dhaboi in Gujarat state, India. Kuvalayananda's father, Sri Ganesa Gune, was a teacher and his mother, Srimati Saraswati, a housewife. The family was not rich and had to depend for some time on public and private charity. Being from a poor family, Kuvalayananda had to struggle hard for his education. Nevertheless, at his matriculation in 1903, he was awarded the Jagannath Shankarsheth Sanskrit Scholarship to study at Baroda College where he graduated in 1910.

During his student days, he was influenced by political leaders like Sri Aurobindo, who was working as a young lecturer at the university, and Lokmanya Tilak's Indian Home Rule Movement. His national idealism and patriotic fervour prompted him to devote his life to the service of humanity. During this time, he took up a vow of lifelong celibacy.

Coming into contact with the Indian masses, many of whom were illiterate and superstitious, he realized the value of education, and this influenced him to help organize the Khandesh Education Society at Amalner, where ultimately he became the Principal of the National College, in 1916. The National College was closed down by the British Government in 1920 due to the spirit of Indian nationalism prevalent at the institution. From 1916 to 1923, he taught Indian culture studies to high school and college students.

== Yoga education ==
Paramahamsa Madhavdas

Kuvalayananda's first guru was Rajaratna Manikrao, a professor at the Jummadada Vyayamshala in Baroda. From 1907 to 1910, Manikrao trained Kuvalayananda in the Indian System of Physical Education which Kuvalayananda advocated throughout his life.

In 1919, he met the Bengali yogin, Paramahamsa Madhavdas, who had settled at Malsar, near Baroda, on the banks of the Narmada river. The insight into Yogic discipline, under Madhavdasji's guidance, greatly affected Kuvalayananda's career. He became a pioneer of a new style of yoga influenced by physical culture.

Though Kuvalayananda was spiritually inclined and idealistic, he was, at the same time, a strict rationalist. So, he sought scientific explanations for the various psychophysical effects of Yoga he experienced. In 1920–21, he investigated the effects of the Yogic practices of uddiyana bandha and nauli on the human body with the help of some of his students in a laboratory at the State Hospital, Baroda. His subjective experience, coupled with the results of these scientific experiments, convinced him that the ancient system of Yoga, if understood through the modern scientific experimental system, could help society. The idea of discovering the scientific basis behind these yogic processes became his life's work.

As early as the 1930s, Kuvalayananda trained large groups of yoga teachers as a way to spread physical education in India.

== Medical research on yoga at Kaivalyadhama ==
"Pure, objective science .. deployed as the handmaiden of spirituality": Kuvalayananda watching an experiment on oxygen consumption in yogic practice at his Kaivalyadhama Health and Yoga Research Center, Lonavala

In 1924, Kuvalayananda founded the Kaivalyadhama Health and Yoga Research Center in Lonavala, Maharashtra, to provide a laboratory for his scientific study of Yoga. In the anthropologist Joseph Alter's words, "what he himself had to prove was that this truth [of classical yoga] was based on natural laws and universal principles. In some sense, pure, objective science was to be deployed as the handmaiden of spirituality and orthodox philosophy so as to establish what came to be the theme of his life's work". His research agenda, although covering a variety of yogic practices (which he divided into asana (postures), pranayama (breathing exercises), and other practices, namely kriyas, mudras, and bandhas), resulted in a detailed study of the physiology involved during each such practice. So, for example, Kaivalyadhama measured the consumption of oxygen of yogins seated cross-legged and practising pranayama; Kuvalayananda explained that while "the westerner" saw deep breathing as useful for providing oxygen, "With us the oxygen value of pranayama is subordinate. We prize it more for its usefulness in nerve culture."

Alter notes that although these experiments ranged over a wide variety of types of measurement—including oxygen consumption, systolic pressure, heart rate, adrenocortical activity, cardiovascular endurance, fibrinolytic activity of the blood, psycho-motor performance, dexterity, serum cholesterol, asthma, obesity, cancer, diabetes, sinusitis, anxiety, urinary pH, lymphocytes and stomach acidity—all of these were "regarded as epiphenomenal in their relationship to the real object of study—the phenomenal meta-material power inherent in Yoga."

These experiments impressed some Western researchers who came to the Kaivalyadhama Health and Yoga Research Center to learn more. Dr. Josephine Rathbone, a professor of health and physical education, visited from Columbia University in 1937 to 1938. K. T. Behanan, a doctoral candidate from Yale University, wrote his dissertation on yoga after visiting in late 1931, and staying for a year. Behanan went on to publish Yoga: A Scientific Evaluation in 1937. In 1957, the physicians Wenger, from the University of California, and Bagchi, from the University of Michigan, spent a month and a half working there. Research and collaboration continues to this day.

== Yoga Mimamsa ==
At the same time as founding his research institute at Lonavla, Kuvalayananda started the first journal devoted to scientific investigation into yoga, Yoga Mimamsa. The journal has been published quarterly every year since its founding and was scheduled to be indexed by EBSCO in 2012. It has covered experiments on the effects of asanas, kriyas, bandhas, and pranayama on humans.

== Later years ==
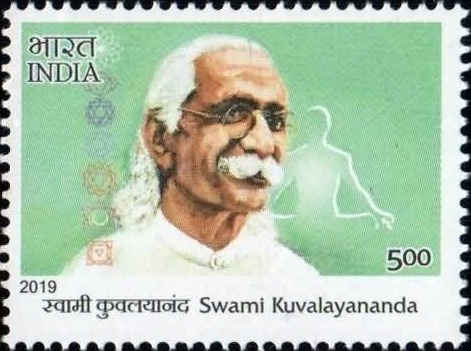
Swami Kuvalayananda on a 2019 stamp of India

Besides his yoga research, Swami Kuvalayananda was a tireless promoter of his causes, and he spent much of his later years opening up new branches of Kaivalyadhama and enhancing the main Kaivalyadhama campus in Lonavala.

In 1932, he opened the Mumbai branch of Kaivalyadhama at Santacruz. It was relocated to Marine Drive (Chowpatty) in 1936, and named the Ishvardas Chunnilal Yogic Health Center. Its mandate is the prevention and cure of various diseases through Yoga. In this same period, at Kanakesvara near Alibaug, a Kaivalyadhama Spiritual Center in Colaba was opened.

In 1943, he opened another branch of Kaivalyadhama in Rajkot, Saurashtra, with spiritual practices as its main focus.

The Gordhandas Seksaria College of Yoga and Cultural Synthesis was established in 1951 at Lonavla to prepare young people spiritually and intellectually for selfless service to humanity.

In 1961, he opened the Srimati Amolak Devi Tirathram Gupta Yogic Hospital for the treatment of chronic functional disorders with the help of Yogic techniques.

Some of his pupils, like the Padma Shri awardee, S. P. Nimbalkar, became known yoga teachers in their own rights.

== Books ==
- Asanas, Kaivalyadhama; 1993 [1931]. ISBN 8189485040.
- Pranayama, Kaivalyadhama; 2005 [1931]. ISBN 8190280368.
- Goraksa-Satakam (translation), Kaivalyadhama; 2006 [1954]. ISBN 818948544X.
- Vashishtha Samhita (translation), Kaivalyadhama; 1969. OCLC 237126083
- Vision and Wisdom (letters), Kaivalyadhama; 1999. ISBN 8189485288.

== Sources ==
- Alter, Joseph S. (August 2004). Yoga in Modern India: The Body between Science and Philosophy. Princeton University Press. ISBN 978-0-691-11874-1.
- Behanan, K. T. (1937). Yoga: A scientific evaluation. Macmillan Publishers.
- Broad, William J. (2012). The Science of Yoga: the Risks and the Rewards. Simon & Schuster. ISBN 978-1-4516-4142-4.
- Goldberg, Elliott (2016). The Path of Modern Yoga : the history of an embodied spiritual practice. Inner Traditions. ISBN 978-1-62055-567-5.
- Singleton, Mark (2010). Yoga body: the origins of modern posture practice. Oxford University Press. ISBN 978-0-19-539534-1.
