= Gurus of Modern Yoga =

2014 collection of essays by Mark Singleton and Ellen Goldberg

- Author: Mark Singleton, Ellen Goldberg
- Subject: Modern yoga
- Genre: Essay collection
- Publication date: 2014
- Media type: Paperback
- Pages: 371
- ISBN: 978-0199938728

Gurus of Modern Yoga is an edited 2014 collection of essays on some of the gurus (leaders) of modern yoga by the yoga scholars Mark Singleton and Ellen Goldberg.

The book has been broadly welcomed by critics as a necessary introduction to some of these figures, though some of them have regretted the book's lack of an evaluation of recent research on the place of the guru in modern yoga, or of an attempt to draw more general conclusions.

== Book ==
Krishnamacharya foregrounded the use of āsana throughout his career, and his teaching shows a highly structured approach to this branch of practice. He used the term vinyāsa krama ("specially ordered steps") to describe a threefold scheme of preparation, main focus, and then release or restoration of balance. His initial experiments with vinyāsa krama seem to have begun in the early 1930s, with the series of dynamic āsana sequences that later came to be known as Ashtanga Vinyasa. In this style, the term vinyāsa indicates the repeated sequence of "jump back", from a posture, partial, or complete sūryanamaskar (known as half or full vinyāsa, respectively), and "jump forward" to the next posture.

— Mark Singleton and Tara Fraser, "T. Krishnamacharya, Father of Modern Yoga", in Gurus of Modern Yoga

Gurus of Modern Yoga was published in 2014 by Oxford University Press in paperback. Each chapter is illustrated with one or two monochrome photographs of the guru that it describes. After an introduction by the editors, Mark Singleton and Ellen Goldberg, the book has six parts, each consisting of edited essays from invited experts:

Part One: Key Figures in Early Twentieth-Century Yoga

- Manufacturing Yogis: Swami Vivekananda as a Yoga Teacher, by Dermot Killingley
- Remembering Sri Aurobindo and the Mother: The Forgotten Lineage of Integral Yoga, by Ann Gleig and Charles I. Flores
- Shri Yogendra: Magic, Modernity and the Burden of the Middle-Class Yogi, by Joseph S. Alter

Part Two: The Lineages of T. Krishnamacharya

- T. Krishnamacharya, Father of Modern Yoga, by Mark Singleton and Tara Fraser
- Authorized by Sri K. Pattabhi Jois: The Role of Parampara and Lineage in Ashtanga Vinyasa Yoga, by Jean Byrne
- B.K.S. Iyengar as a Yoga Teacher and Yoga Guru, by Frederick M. Smith and Joan White
- The Institutionalization of the Yoga Tradition: Gurus B. K. S. Iyengar and Yogini Sunita in Britain, by Suzanne Newcombe

Part Three: Tantra Based Gurus

- Swami Krpalvananda: The Man Behind Kripalu Yoga, by Ellen Goldberg
- Muktananda: Entrepreneurial Godman, Tantric Hero, by Andrea R. Jain
- Stretching toward the Sacred: John Friend and Anusara Yoga, by Lola Williamson

Part Four: Bhaktiyoga

- Svaminarayana: Bhaktiyoga and the Aksarabhraman Guru, by Hanna H. Kim
- Sathya Sai Baba and the Repertoire of Yoga, by Smriti Srinivas

Part Five: Technology

- Engineering an Artful Practice: On Jaggi Vasudev's ISHA Yoga and Sri Sri Ravi Shakar's Art of Living, by Joanne Punzo Waghorne
- Online Bhakti in a Modern Guru Organization, by Maya Warrier

Part Six: Nation-Builders

- Eknath Ranade, Gurus and Jivanvratis (life-workers): Vivekananda Kendra's Promotion of the Yoga Way of Life, by Gwilym Beckerlegge
- Swami Ramdev: Modern Yoga Revolutionary, by Stuart Sarbacker

== Reception ==
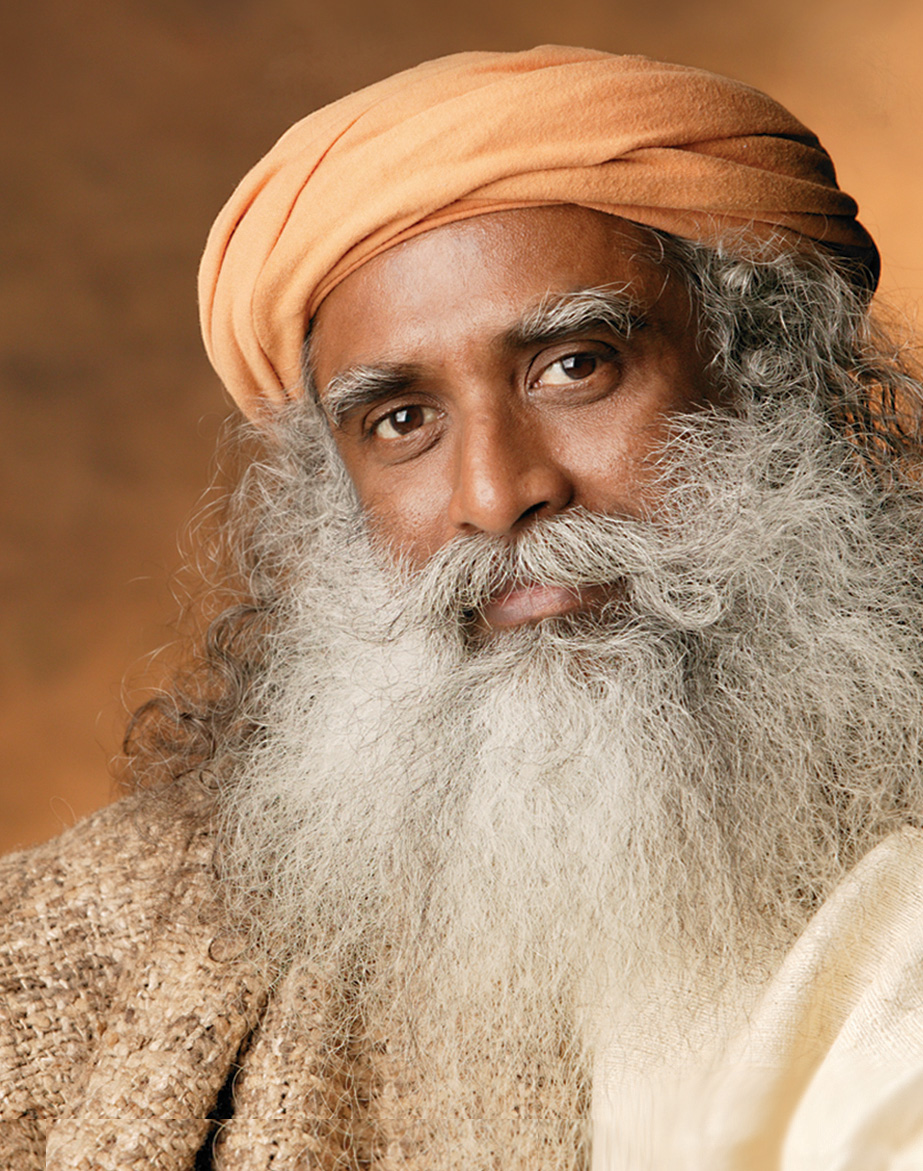
Jaggi Vasudev, one of the gurus better-known to followers than to scholars before the publication of Gurus of Modern Yoga

Miriam Y. Perkins, reviewing Gurus of Modern Yoga for Spiritus: A Journal of Christian Spirituality, writes that the book provides a "compendium of multiple and influential yoga philosophies and their spiritual founders" with a "sound and balanced entry into this complexity and helpful orientation to the dynamics of popular spiritual seeking through related practices." She finds its inclusion of women gurus "an important contribution".

Jeffrey D. Long, in his review essay in the Religious Studies Review, calls the volume "outstanding".

Knut A. Jacobsen, reviewing the book for Numen, noted that the book's gurus developed their own types of yoga for a "global spiritual market", becoming "world teachers with communities of followers" in numerous countries. Jacobsen writes that modern postural yoga differs from gymnastics in having gurus, one aspect of its Indian heritage; he praises Dermot Killingley's account of Vivekananda as "a guru in the modern sense" with "a large but ill-defined following". On the account of Krishnamacharya by Singleton and Tara Fraser, he comments that the validity of their label "father of modern yoga" depends on what one means by yoga, but that it indicates the fact that by the 2000s, most "modern transnational yoga" is postural, with a large debt to Krishnamacharya; the account uncovers the "many layers of facts and fiction" in the often hagiographical tales of Krishnamacharya's life.

Beatrix Hauser's review in Asian Ethnology notes the strengths of the book, with contributions from well-known experts, and its weaknesses, such as that it does not analyse recent work on guru faith or new religious movements, and the contributions vary in theoretical basis and scope. Accordingly, she finds it hard to draw a general conclusion, though she calls the collection "highly stimulating". In her view, the most important aspect of the book is that it "relinks the debate on modern postural yoga in the West to its Indian parallels and counterparts, showing also its continuum with notions of healing and health in recent forms of bhakti yoga". She regrets that the book does not draw out conclusions on what the new position and role of the guru actually is.

Kimberley Pingatore, reviewing the work for Religion, calls it a vast and fascinating collection, illustrating "the dynamic and varied conceptualizations that comprise the term guru within the context of modern yoga". She notes that the authors characterise their gurus as often having themselves sought a cure for their childhood illnesses in yoga, i.e. the benefits of yoga would be physical, "not necessarily immortality or enlightenment", though these could be linked.

Philip Deslippe, in his review in Nova Religio, calls the book a "substantial contribution", presenting the guru as "both a global ambassador and popularizer of modern yoga, and also a figure that has undergone tremendous alterations as part of yoga’s global ascent to prevalence and popularity". In his view, the accounts of Swami Ramdev, Sri Ravi Shankar and Jaggi Vasudev are much needed, as these hugely popular leaders had been little studied; but the focus on exceptional individuals made it hard for readers to see "the larger structural shifts that set the stage for them to appear".

== Sources ==
- Singleton, Mark; Goldberg, Ellen (2014). Gurus of Modern Yoga. Oxford University Press. ISBN 978-0199938728.
