= Yoga in Modern India =

2004 book on history of yoga by Joseph Alter

- On the book's cover, a yogi sits in meditation
- Author: Joseph Alter
- Subject: History of modern yoga
- Publisher: Princeton University Press
- Publication date: 2004
- Pages: 326

Yoga in Modern India is a 2004 book by the anthropologist Joseph Alter about the history and practice of yoga in the 20th century. It was one of the first scholarly studies of modern yoga. The book won the 2006 Association for Asian Studies' Coomaraswamy Book Prize.

== Book ==
=== Synopsis ===
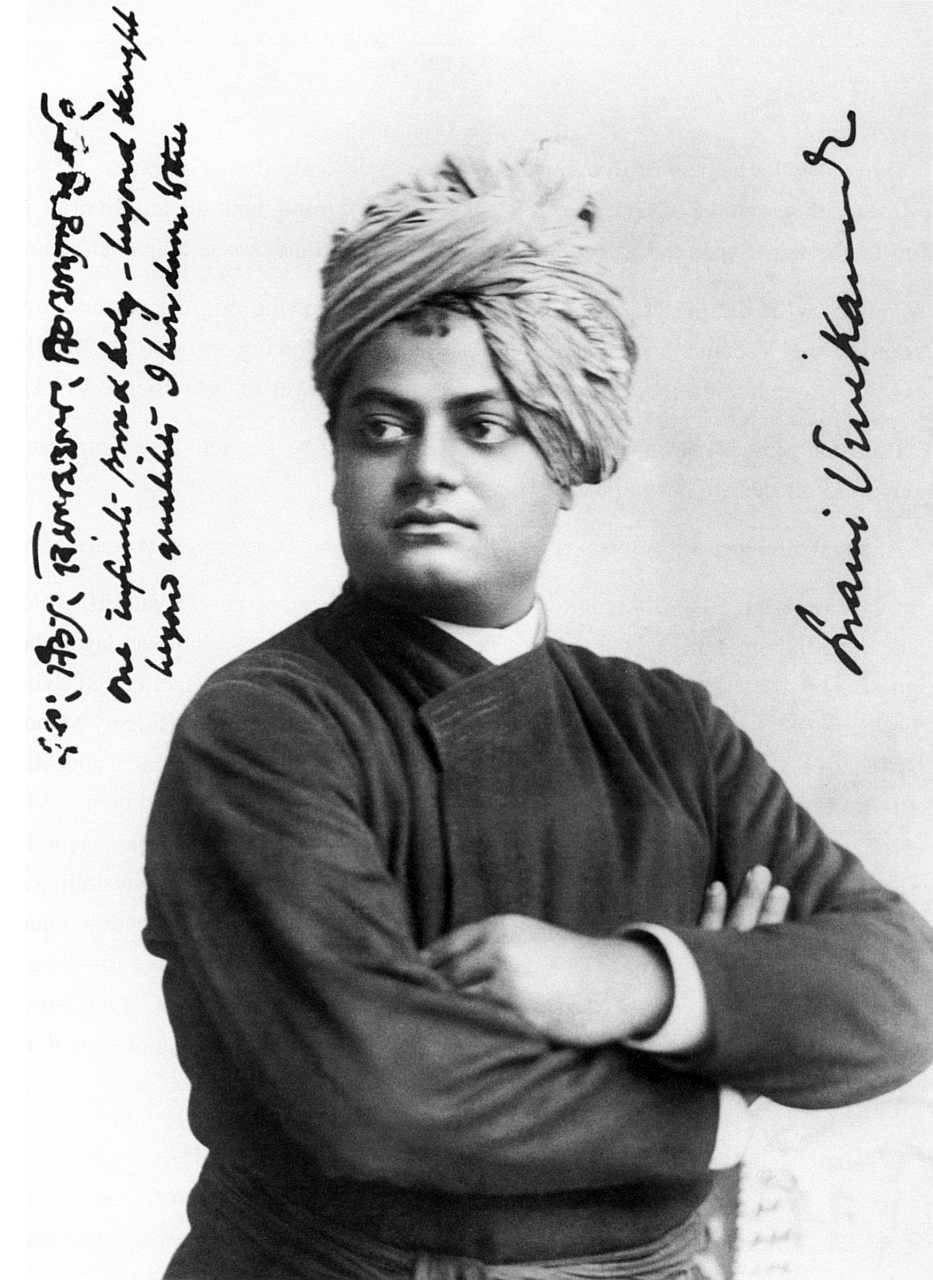
Swami Vivekananda brought yoga to the West in the 1890s, but without asanas.

In Yoga in Modern India: The Body between Science and Philosophy, the anthropologist Joseph Alter examines three main themes in the history and practice of yoga in the 20th century: Swami Kuvalayananda's medicalisation of yoga; naturopathic yoga; and the influence of the Hindu nationalist Rashtriya Swayamsevak Sangh (RSS) on the development of yoga as exercise.

The book begins by setting yoga in its historical context, at once one of Hinduism's six schools of philosophy and a modern fitness activity. Alter discusses the way haṭha yoga in particular has been called a science in India, requiring it to be distanced from religion. This was accomplished by Kuvalayananda's investigations of medical effects of haṭha yoga, paving the way for yoga to be seen in the West as a form of exercise. Yoga was then, Alter argues, fitted into the western idea of a nature cure; Gandhi's ashrams offered this as a way of life. Meanwhile, the RSS fused the ideas of nationalism, Hindu culture, and what Vivekananda had called "man making", using yoga for fitness. In keeping with this, Dr. S.V. Karandikar and Dr. Kumar Pal ran centres teaching yoga as a therapy. Alter notes the practice of amarolī, the drinking of one's own urine, mentioned in the Hatha Yoga Pradipika and advocated in 1918 by J.W. Armstrong and later R.M. Patel as a nature cure. This was vaguely linked to ayurveda, Indian alternative medicine. The book ends by arguing that yoga's view that thinking goes with misperception has been moved from a philosophical context to social history. Alter concludes by mentioning Dr. K.N. Udapa's experimental rats doing headstands, which Alter calls ridiculous, but also "the shadow form of the sage lost in the Himalayas".

=== Publication ===
The book was published as a paperback by Princeton University Press in 2004, both in the UK and in the USA. It is illustrated with 10 monochrome figures, including photographs and drawings, in the text.

== Reception ==
Stuart Ray Sarbacker, reviewing the book in History of Religions, found the book illuminating on the historical background of yoga, complete with "acerbic asides, including several humorous references to Yoga Journal and its sociological and ideological placement in American consumer society." In his view, the examples were well-researched and brought to life with suitable photographs.

Cecilia Van Hollen, reviewing Yoga in Modern India for The Journal of Asian Studies, writes that it aims to correct the popular tendency to imagine an Indian, spiritual yoga opposed to a corrupt, materialistic American yoga, by examining what Indian texts from the 20th century say about yoga, and constructing a social history of the subject. In her view, what emerges is yoga "as a transnational system of knowledge and practice that emerged in the interstices of colonialism, anticolonial nationalism, and postcolonial Hindu nationalism." She notes that Alter calls the Indian government-led fusion of the yogic subtle body with the physical body of modern anatomy and physiology in the early 20th century a "mistake". All the same, she writes, it helped to transform yoga into what Alter called the "tremendously popular, eminently public, self-disciplinary regimen that produces good health and well being, while always holding out the promise of final liberation." She observes also that Alter shows what "strange bedfellows" yoga and Hindu nationalism were, for while the Rashtriya Swayamsevak Sangh (RSS) could readily adopt yoga's physical and mental discipline to make men strong, yoga's philosophy is the opposite of "narrowly Hindu".

The yoga scholar Mark Singleton calls the book one of the main (early) studies of the development of modern yoga, like Elizabeth De Michelis's 2004 book examining Vivekananda's "asana-free" yoga in the 1890s and the emergence of postural yoga in the 1920s, but not explaining either why asanas were absent at the start of that period, or how they became rehabilitated. Singleton however endorses Alter's methodology, namely to examine modern yoga's truth claims critically while also exploring the context and reasons for those claims, and considers both De Michelis and Alter to be "critically aware" of modern yoga's "dialectical relationship with tradition". The scholar Andrea R. Jain broadly agrees with Singleton, noting that posture "only became prominent in modern yoga in the early twentieth century as a result of the dialogical exchanges between Indian reformers and nationalists and Americans and Europeans interested in health and fitness".

The book won the 2006 Association for Asian Studies' Coomaraswamy Book Prize.

== Sources ==
- Alter, Joseph S. (2004). Yoga in Modern India: The Body between Science and Philosophy. Princeton, New Jersey and Woodstock, Oxfordshire: Princeton University Press. ISBN 978-0691118741.
