= Mark Singleton (yoga scholar) =

Scholar of yoga

- Occupation: Yoga scholar
- Known for: Yoga Body (2010), thesis: modern yoga as exercise was shaped in 20th century

Academic background
- Education: University of Cambridge
- Thesis: The Body at the Centre: Contexts of Postural Yoga in the Modern Age (2007)
- Doctoral advisor: Elizabeth De Michelis

Mark Singleton is a scholar and practitioner of yoga. He studied yoga intensively in India, and became a qualified yoga teacher, until returning to England to study divinity and research the origins of modern postural yoga. His doctoral dissertation, which argued that posture-based forms of yoga represent a radical break from haṭha yoga tradition, with different goals, and an unprecedented emphasis on āsanas, was later published in book form as the widely-read Yoga Body.

Singleton was a senior research fellow at the School of Oriental and African Studies at the University of London, working on the European Research Council-funded Hatha Yoga Project. As an editor of scholarly texts and essays on yoga, his works have been widely praised and well received by scholars. Gurus of Modern Yoga and Roots of Yoga are both considered important contributions to the field of yoga.

== Education and career ==
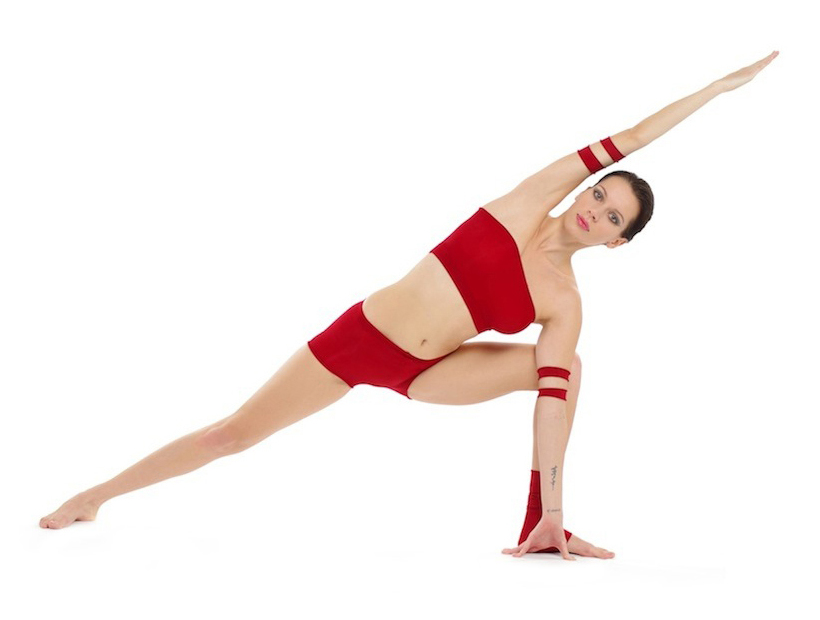
Singleton argued in his 2010 book Yoga Body, following Norman Sjoman, that many standing asanas with simple descriptive names, such as Utthita Parshvakonasana, Sanskrit for "Extended Side Angle Pose", were brought into modern postural yoga in the 20th century.

=== Practitioner ===
Singleton spent three years in India in the 1990s learning yoga intensively, both physically and mentally, becoming a qualified teacher of Iyengar Yoga and Satyananda Yoga. He said that the classes and workshops that he took were aimed mostly at "Western yoga pilgrims", and that authentic, traditional Indian yoga was strikingly difficult to find. He continued his intensive yoga practice with two and a half hours early each morning and teaching or taking classes in the evenings, but focused his days on studying the history and philosophy of yoga. His studies caused him what he referred to as "something like a crisis of faith", namely, the discovery that modern āsana-based yoga had much more recent origins than was claimed for it.

=== Scholar ===
Returning to England, he attended Cambridge University, working as a research assistant at the Dharam Hinduja Institute of Indic Research from 2002 to 2003, and earning his Doctor of Philosophy (PhD) in divinity in 2007 under the supervision of Elizabeth De Michelis. He continued his study of Sanskrit to enable him to access medieval haṭha yoga texts.

From 2006 to 2013 he taught at St John's College, Santa Fe. Meanwhile, he served as consultant for the Smithsonian exhibition Yoga: The Art of Transformation, contributing also to the exhibition catalogue.

After leaving the St John's College faculty, he went on to serve under James Mallinson, a renowned indologist, as a senior research fellow at the School of Oriental and African Studies (SOAS) from 2015 to 2020. At SOAS, he worked on the European Research Council-funded Hatha Yoga Project, researching and translating yoga practice texts from Sanskrit and other languages. At the same time, he served as the co-chair for the American Academy of Religions group studying yoga in theory and practice.

== Major works and reception ==
In 2009, Singleton began editing scholarly collections on yoga. His works have been considered valuable in the field of yoga. One of his books, Yoga Body, has gained a wider readership despite its scholarly approach, attracting both praise and criticism.

=== Yoga in the Modern World ===
The researcher Suzanne Newcombe, reviewing the 2009 collection Yoga in the Modern World edited by Singleton and Jean Byrne, notes that several of the chapters "successfully combine emic experience (seen from inside) with an etic analysis. Burley and Liberman openly declare that, in addition to being established scholars, they also teach forms of modern yoga. For Nevrin, Smith, and Strauss, experiencing the practice of yoga is an inherent part of a rigorous anthropological understanding that acknowledges embodied experience." In Newcombe's view, "rigorous academic reflection" on modern yoga is an "interesting" development, making the book a valuable overview of the field.

=== Yoga Body ===
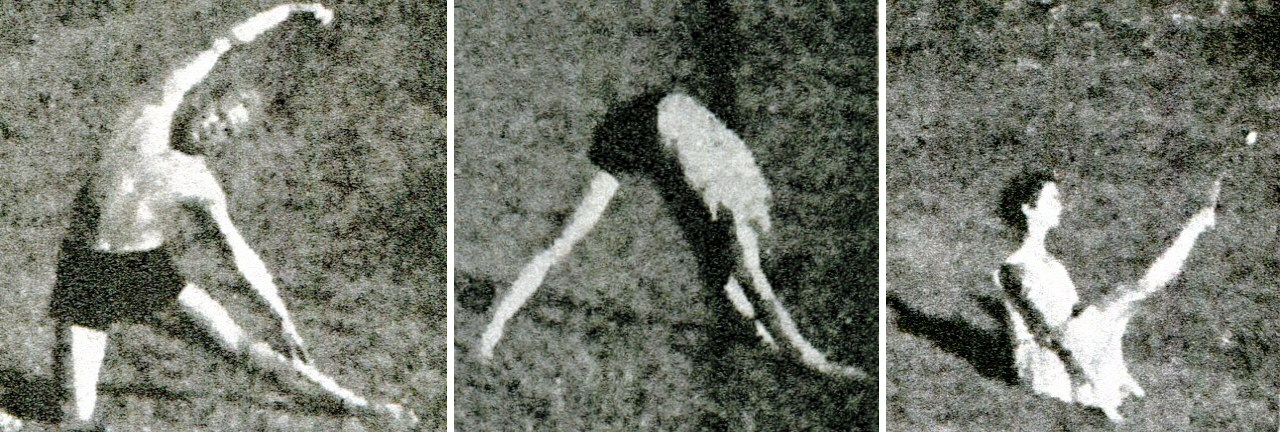
Singleton noted that postures in Niels Bukh's 1924 Primary Gymnastics resembled several asanas in modern postural yoga, suggesting that Krishnamacharya had been influenced by the gymnastics culture of his time.

In 2010 Singleton published a revised version of his PhD thesis on yoga as exercise, Yoga Body: The Origins of Modern Posture Practice; it argues that certain modern forms of yoga represent a radical reworking of the haṭha yoga tradition in both content (dropping most haṭha practices other than āsanas) and purpose (exercise rather than mokṣa, spiritual liberation), and that the incorporation of many standing āsanas into popular yoga reflects the rise of systems of modern physical culture (such as Niels Bukh's Primitive Gymnastics) widespread in India during the 20th century. He noted that āsanas were brought to the Western world in the early 20th century by Yogendra; postural yoga was developed further by Kuvalayananda, Vishnudevananda, and by Krishnamacharya and his pupils Indra Devi, B. K. S. Iyengar, and K. Pattabhi Jois.

Singleton notes that while some āsanas are undoubtedly ancient, traditional sources such as Patanjali's Yoga Sutras say nothing of the best-known modern yoga poses like downward dog. Krishnamacharya's method, Singleton wrote, was "a synthesis of several extant methods of physical training that (prior to this period) would have fallen well outside any definition of yoga," making use of haṭha yoga, the British army's calisthenic exercises, and Niels Bukh's primary or primitive gymnastics from Denmark.

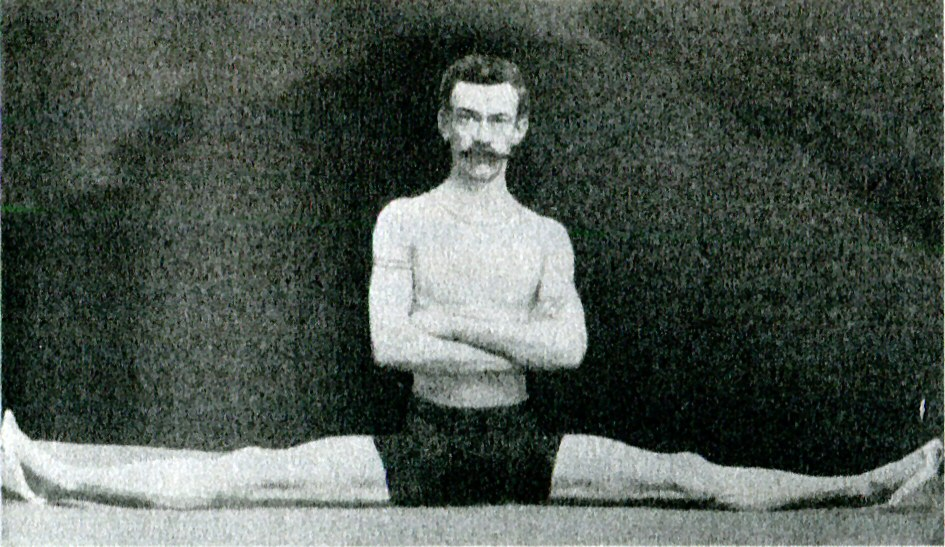
In Yoga Body, Singleton sets modern yoga in context with images such as this pose close to Samakonasana in Thomas Dwight's "The Anatomy of a Contortionist", Scribner's Magazine, April 1889

The book was widely read both by scholars and by practitioners, arousing sometimes strong reactions. The book was attacked from two sides: saffronising Hindu nationalists wanting to reclaim yoga as a single thing, distinctively Indian; and modern global yoga marketing wanting to wrap its product "in the mantle of antiquity" to maximise sales. In 2011, Mallinson pointed out that it had become a catalyst in arguments over "who owns yoga", despite the deep antisectarianism in the medieval texts; and that Yoga Body reiterated that yoga was always meant to be "a practical method of achieving liberation that was open to all, irrespective of philosophy or theology". Mallinson questioned Singleton's view that modern postural yoga was only lightly related to medieval haṭha yoga, giving examples of asanas with definite medieval origins.

Harold Coward, reviewing Yoga Body for the Journal of Hindu-Christian Studies, admired its analysis and accessibility. The yoga instructor Timothy Burgin, reviewing it for Yoga Basics, calls it "fascinating and remarkable", both well-documented and likely to "ruffle a few yogis' feathers". The yoga teacher Jill Miller, reviewing the book on Gaiam, observes that the book agreed with the intuition that many āsanas were similar to those in martial arts, and that authenticity in yoga was not what it seemed. The author Matthew Remski, writing in Yoga International, called the publication "a watershed moment in the history of global asana culture." He agrees that the book is "uncomfortable", gently deconstructing terms like "original" and "authentic", pointing instead to the student-teacher relationship. He finds the book strongly "yogic", weaving together "the cultural and the personal".

He has written about his work in The New York Times and the Yoga Journal, including a tribute to B. K. S. Iyengar, an Indian yoga teacher who brought yoga as exercise to Westerners.

=== Gurus of Modern Yoga ===
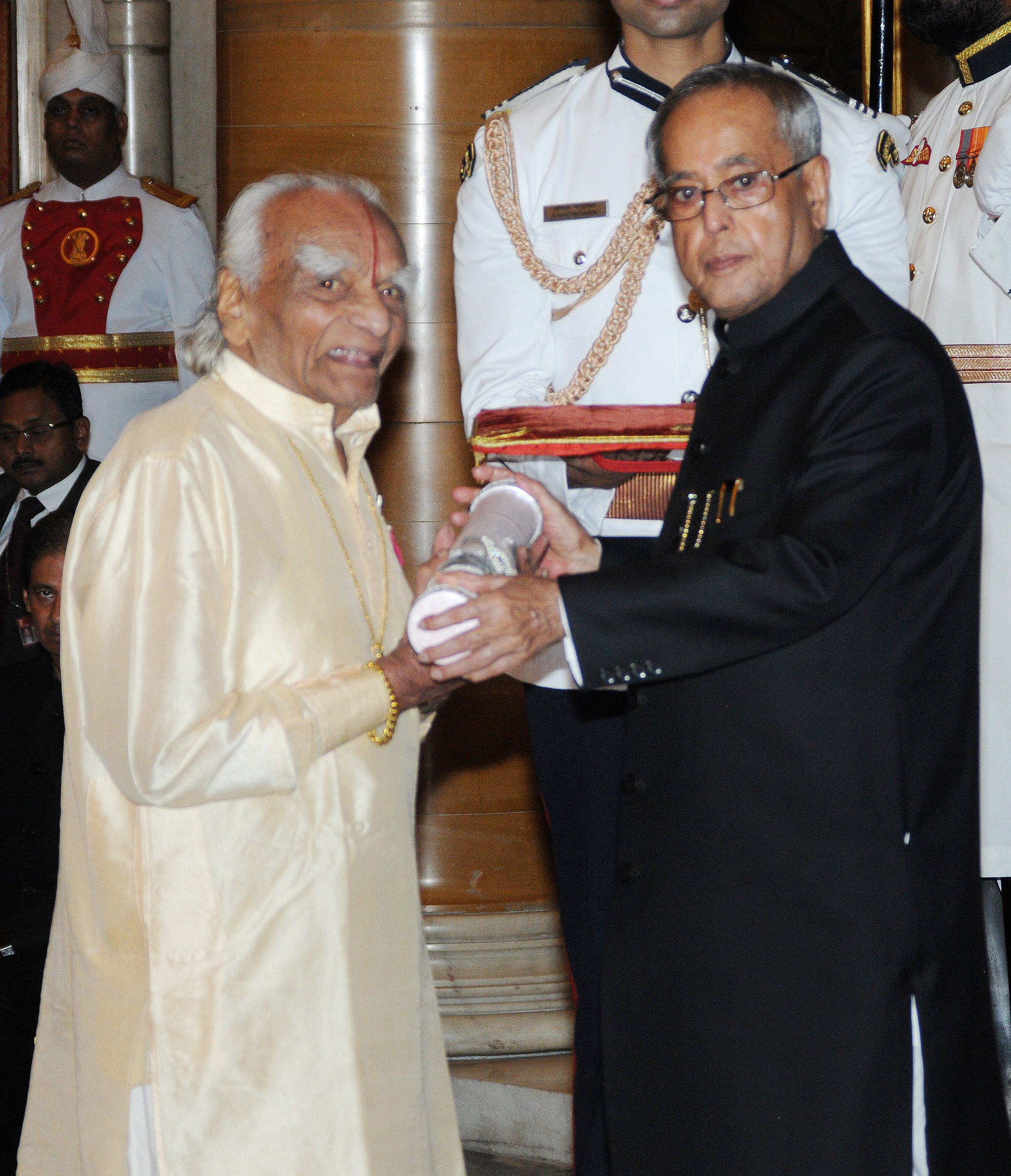
Singleton's 2014 book Gurus of Modern Yoga covers leaders such as B. K. S. Iyengar, seen here with the president of India.

In 2014, Singleton and Ellen Goldberg edited the collection Gurus of Modern Yoga. Scholars reviewing the book found it an important and substantial addition, even "outstanding", to the often limited scholarly analysis of modern yoga gurus, especially of female leaders, though some regretted the lack of a chapter comparing existing work, or an overall conclusion." She finds its inclusion of women gurus "an important contribution".

=== Roots of Yoga ===
While working at SOAS, he co-authored Roots of Yoga with Mallinson. This is a collection of mostly original translations of over one hundred yoga texts, mainly from Sanskrit but with texts from The sources were written in Sanskrit, Tibetan, Arabic, Persian, Bengali, Tamil, Pali, Kashmiri, Old Marathi, Avadhi, and Braj Bhasha, the last two being early forms of Hindi. Its eleven themed chapters cover many of the traditional practices of yoga (such as āsana, prāṇāyāma, mudrā, meditation, and mantra) as well as essential contexts for practising yoga (such as preliminaries to yoga practice, the yogic body, siddhi or special powers, and mokṣa, liberation). The book, published in 2017, has a main introduction summarizing the history of yoga and yoga scholarship, while each chapter has its own shorter contextual introduction and notes.

Scholars reviewing Roots of Yoga universally welcomed the wealth of sources, from ancient times to the 19th century, made available for the first time in English in the book, and admired the editors' lack of partisanship. Reviewers noted that the collection would be useful to scholars, yoga teachers, and practitioners. They admired the concise and erudite introduction to the texts, and that it would quickly become a classic.

== Other works ==
=== Articles ===
- Singleton, Mark. "Salvation through relaxation: Proprioceptive therapy and its relationship to yoga". Journal of Contemporary Religion, 20.3 (2005): 289–304.
- Singleton, Mark. "Yoga, eugenics, and spiritual Darwinism in the early twentieth century". International Journal of Hindu Studies, 11.2 (2007): 125–146.
- Singleton, Mark. "Suggestive therapeutics: new thought's relationship to modern yoga". Asian Medicine, 3.1 (2007): 64–84.
- Singleton, Mark and Birch, Jason (2019) "The Yoga of the Haṭhābhyāsapaddhati: Haṭhayoga on the Cusp of Modernity". Journal of Yoga Studies, (2), pp 3–70.

=== Book chapters ===
- Singleton, Mark and Larios, Borayin (2020) "The Scholar-practitioner of yoga in the western academy". In: O'Brien-Kop, Karen and Newcombe, Suzanne, (eds.), Routledge Handbook of Yoga and Meditation Studies. Abingdon and New York: Routledge, pp 37–50.
- Singleton, Mark (2020) "Early Hatha Yoga". In: O'Brien-Kop, Karen and Newcombe, Suzanne, (eds.), Routledge Handbook of Yoga and Meditation Studies. Abingdon and New York: Routledge, pp 120–129.
- Singleton, Mark (2017) "The Spiritual Body in Twentieth-Century Yoga". Proceedings of the International Workshop, Modernization and Spiritual, Mental and Physical Practices: From Yoga to Reiki. Kyoto: Institute for Research in Humanities, (Jinbunken), Kyoto University.
- Singleton, Mark (2017) "David Frawley and Vedic Yoga". In: Guenzi, Caterina and Voix, Raphaël, (eds.), In the name of the Veda: Referring to Vedic Authority in India and Abroad. Abingdon; New York: Routledge.
- Singleton, Mark (2016) "Introduction". Telo joge: koreni moderne posturalne prakse. Belgrade: Neopress Publishing.
- Singleton, Mark (2015) "Yoga and physical culture: Transnational history and blurred discursive contexts". In: Jacobsen, Knut A., (ed.), Routledge Handbook of Contemporary India. London: Routledge, pp 172–184.

=== Translations ===
- Singleton, Mark (2017) Translation of article "Religious Modernity", by Sébastian Tank-Storper. Dictionnaire des faits religieux [English Edition], Dictionnaires Quadrige.

== Books ==
- Singleton, Mark; Byrne, Jean (2009). Yoga in the Modern World: Contemporary Perspectives. Routledge. ISBN 978-0415570862.
- Singleton, Mark (2010). Yoga Body : the origins of modern posture practice. Oxford University Press. ISBN 978-0-19-539534-1. OCLC 318191988.
- Singleton, Mark; Goldberg, Ellen (2014). Gurus of Modern Yoga. Oxford University Press. ISBN 978-0199938728.
- Mallinson, James; Singleton, Mark (2017). Roots of Yoga. Penguin Books. ISBN 978-0-241-25304-5. OCLC 928480104.
