= Modern yoga =

Yoga practices popular in contemporary times

Modern yoga is a wide range of yoga practices with differing purposes, encompassing in its various forms yoga philosophy derived from the Vedas, asanas (physical postures derived from hatha yoga), devotional and tantra-based practices, and Hindu nation-building approaches.

The scholar Elizabeth de Michelis proposed a four-part typology of modern yoga in 2004, separating modern psychosomatic, denominational, postural, and meditational yogas. Other scholars have noted that her work stimulated research into the history, sociology, and anthropology of modern yoga, but have not all accepted her typology. They have variously emphasised modern yoga's international nature with its intercultural exchanges; its variety of beliefs and practices; its degree of continuity with older traditions, such as ancient Indian philosophy and medieval hatha yoga; its relationship to Hinduism; its claims to provide health and fitness; and its tensions between the physical and the spiritual, or between the esoteric and the scientific.

== Origins ==
=== Early modern yoga ===
In the early years of British colonialism in India, the elites from the United States, Europe, and India rejected the concept of hatha yoga and perceived it as unsociable. By the late 19th century, yoga was presented to the Western world in different forms such as by Vivekananda and Madame Blavatsky. It embodied the period's distaste for asanas – physical postures derived from hatha yoga – and hatha yoga more generally, as practised by the despised Nath yogins, by not mentioning them. Blavatsky helped to pave the way for the spread of yoga in the West by encouraging interest in occult and esoteric doctrines and a vision of the "mystical East". She had travelled to India in 1852–53, and became greatly interested in yoga in general, while despising and distrusting hatha yoga. In the 1890s, Vivekananda taught a mixture of yoga breathwork (pranayama), meditation, and positive thinking, derived from the New Thought movement, again explicitly rejecting the practice of asanas and hatha yoga.

=== Yoga as exercise ===
A few decades later, a very different form of yoga, the prevailing yoga as exercise, was created by Yogendra, Kuvalayananda, and Krishnamacharya, starting in the 1920s. It was predominantly physical, consisting mainly or entirely of asanas, postures derived from those of hatha yoga, but with a contribution from Western gymnastics (such as Niels Bukh's 1924 Primary Gymnastics and the harmonial gymnastics of women such as Genevieve Stebbins, Annie Payson Call, and Mary (Mollie) Bagot Stack). They advocated this form of exercise under the guise of the supposed specific medical benefits of particular postures, quietly dropping its religious connotations, encouraged by the prevailing Indian nationalism which needed something to build an image of a strong and energetic nation. The yoga that they created, however, was taken up predominantly in the English-speaking world, starting with America and Britain.

=== Popularization ===
The popularity of modern yoga increased as travel became more feasible, allowing exposure to different teachings and practices. Immigration restrictions were relaxed from India to the United States and some parts of Europe around the 1960s. And, spiritual gurus began to offer what they referred to as solutions to the problems of modern life. As new-age high profile individuals, such as the Beatles, tried out yoga, the practice became more visible and desirable as a means to improve life.

== De Michelis's four types ==
The idea of yoga as "modern" was current before any definition of it was provided; for example, the philosopher Ernest Wood referred to it in the title of his 1948 book Practical Yoga, Ancient and Modern. Elizabeth de Michelis started the academic study of modern yoga with her 2004 typology. She defined modern yoga as "signifying those disciplines and schools which are, to a greater or lesser extent, rooted in South Asian cultural contexts, and which more specifically draw inspiration from certain philosophies, teachings and practices of Hinduism." With Vivekananda's 1896 Raja Yoga as its starting point, her typology of yoga forms, explicitly excluding those seen only in India, proposed four subtypes.

De Michelis Type	De Michelis Definition	Example given by De Michelis of "relatively pure contemporary types"	Image of example guru named by De Michelis
"Modern Psychosomatic Yoga"	Body-Mind-Spirit training Emphasises practical experience Little restriction on doctrine Practised in a privatised setting	The Yoga Institute, Santa Cruz (Yogendra, 1918); Kaivalyadhama, Lonavla (Kuvalayananda, 1924); Sivananda yoga (Sivananda, Vishnudevananda, etc., 1959); Himalayan Institute (Swami Rama, 1971)	Yogendra, c. 1920
"Modern Denominational Yoga"	Neo-Hindu gurus Emphasis on each school's own teachings Own belief system and authorities Cultic environment, sometimes sectarian May use all other forms of Modern Yoga	Brahma Kumaris (Lekhraj Kripalani, 1930s); Sahaja Yoga (Nirmala Srivastava, 1970); ISKCON (A. C. Bhaktivedanta Swami Prabhupada, 1966); Rajneeshism (Rajneesh, c. 1964); Late Transcendental Meditation	Nirmala Srivastava, 1994
"Modern Postural Yoga" (Note: This corresponds to the yoga as exercise widespread in the Western world.)	Emphasises asanas (yoga postures) and pranayama	Iyengar Yoga (B. K. S. Iyengar, c. 1966); Ashtanga Vinyasa Yoga (Pattabhi Jois, c. 1948)	Pattabhi Jois, 2006
"Modern Meditational Yoga"	Emphasises mental techniques of concentration and meditation	Early Transcendental Meditation (Maharishi Mahesh Yogi, 1950s); Sri Chinmoy, c. 1964 some current Buddhist organisations (Note: On page 73, De Michelis refers readers to Gombrich & Obeyesekere 1988 and Sharf 1995 for more on Buddhist contexts.)	Maharishi Mahesh Yogi, 1978

From the 1970s, modern yoga spread across many countries of the world, changing as it did so, and in De Michelis's view becoming "an integral part of (primarily) urban cultures worldwide", to the extent that the word yoga in the Western world now means the practice of asanas, typically in a class. (Note: De Michelis notes that to speakers of Indic languages, yoga has a "quite different" semantic range, including meditation, prayer, ritual and devotional practices, ethical behaviour, and "secret esoteric techniques" that average English speakers would not consider to be yoga.)

== Other viewpoints ==
=== Endless variety ===
Mark Singleton, a scholar of yoga's history and practices, states that De Michelis's typology provides categories useful as a way into the study of yoga in the modern age, but that it is not a "good starting point for history insofar as it subsumes detail, variation, and exception". Singleton does not subscribe to De Michelis's interpretative framework, instead considering "modern yoga" to be a descriptive name for "yoga in the modern age". He questions the De Michelis typology as follows:

Can we really refer to an entity called Modern Yoga and assume that we are talking about a discrete and identifiable category of beliefs and practices? Does Modern Yoga, as some seem to assume, differ in ontological status (and hence intrinsic value) from "traditional yoga"? Does it represent a rupture in terms of tradition rather than a continuity? And in the plethora of experiments, adaptations, and innovations that make up the field of transnational yoga today, should we be thinking of all these manifestations as belonging to Modern Yoga in any typological sense?

— Mark Singleton

A sample of the diversity of modern yoga practices
De Michelis Type	"Modern Psychosomatic Yoga"	"Modern Postural Yoga"	"Modern Denominational Yoga"	"Modern Meditational Yoga"
Example system	Sivananda Yoga	Iyengar Yoga, Ashtanga Yoga	Sahaja Yoga	Transcendental; Meditation
Claimed source	Vedas	Patanjali	Hinduism, etc	Advaita Vedanta
Goal	Natural ease	Healthy body and mind	Self-realisation, mental silence	Stress relief, higher consciousness
8 limbs of Patanjali's yoga	#3 Asana #4 Pranayama #7 Dhyana	#3 Asana #4 Pranayama	—	—
Invocation to Patanjali	—	Yes	—	—
Relaxation	Yes	—	—	—
Vegetarian diet	Yes	—	—	—
Kundalini awakening	—	—	Yes	—
Meditation	Yes	—	Yes	Yes
Mantra	—	—	—	Yes

"The father of modern yoga" Krishnamacharya teaching postural yoga in Mysore, 1930s

Modern yoga is derived in part from Haṭha yoga (one aspect of traditional yoga), with innovative practices that have taken the Indian heritage, experimented with techniques from non-Indic cultures, and radically adapted it into local forms worldwide. The scholar of religion Andrea Jain calls modern yoga "a variety of systems that developed as early as the 19th century as a [response to] capitalist production, colonial and industrial endeavors, global developments in areas ranging from metaphysics to fitness, and modern ideas and values." In contemporary practice, modern yoga is prescribed as a part of self-development and is believed to provide "increased beauty, strength, and flexibility as well as decreased stress".

Modern yoga is variously viewed through "cultural prisms" including New Age religion, psychology, sports science, medicine, photography, and fashion. Jain states that although "hatha yoga is traditionally believed to be the ur-system of modern postural yoga, equating them does not account for the historical sources". According to her, asanas "only became prominent in modern yoga in the early twentieth century as a result of the dialogical exchanges between Indian reformers and nationalists and Americans and Europeans interested in health and fitness". In short, Jain writes, "modern yoga systems ... bear little resemblance to the yoga systems that preceded them. This is because [both] ... are specific to their own social contexts."

=== Leaders ===
Modern yoga has been led for over a century by disparate gurus, ranging from Vivekananda (1863-1902) with his Vedanta-based yoga philosophy to Krishnamacharya (1888-1989) with his gymnastic approach (his pupils including the influential Pattabhi Jois teaching asanas linked by flowing vinyasa movements and B. K. S. Iyengar teaching precisely-positioned asanas, often using props). The gurus' approaches to yoga span the tantra-based Kripalu Yoga of Swami Kripalvananda and the Siddha Yoga of Muktananda; the Bhaktiyoga of Svaminarayana, and of Sathya Sai Baba; the "inner technology" of Jaggi Vasudev (Sadhguru)'s Isha Yoga and Sri Sri Ravi Shankar's "Art of Living"; and finally the Hindu nation-building approaches of Eknath Ranade and of Swami Ramdev. The work of these gurus has disseminated yoga widely across the western world, and has radically transformed yoga in the process. Health benefits have been claimed; yoga has been brought to a "spiritual marketplace" (different gurus competing for followers), and widely differing approaches have claimed ancient roots in Indian tradition. The result has been to transform yoga from "a hidden, weird thing" to "yoga studios on almost every corner", in a "massive transition from spiritual practice to focusing on health and fitness". The trend away from authority continues in post-lineage yoga, which is practised outside any major school or guru's lineage.

The author and yoga-teacher Matthew Remski writes that Norman Sjoman (Note: Norman Sjoman wrote The Yoga Tradition of the Mysore Palace in 1996.) considered modern yoga to have been influenced by South Indian wrestling exercises; Joseph Alter (Note: Joseph Alter wrote Yoga in Modern India: The Body between Science and Philosophy in History of Religions in 2004.) found it torn between esoteric and scientific; Mark Singleton (Note: Mark Singleton wrote Yoga Body: the origins of modern posture practice in 2010.) discovered a collision of Western physical culture with Indian spirituality; while Elliott Goldberg (Note: Elliott Goldberg wrote The Path of Modern Yoga in 2016.) depicted "a modern spirituality, written through richly realized characters" including Krishnamacharya, Sivananda, Indra Devi, and Iyengar.

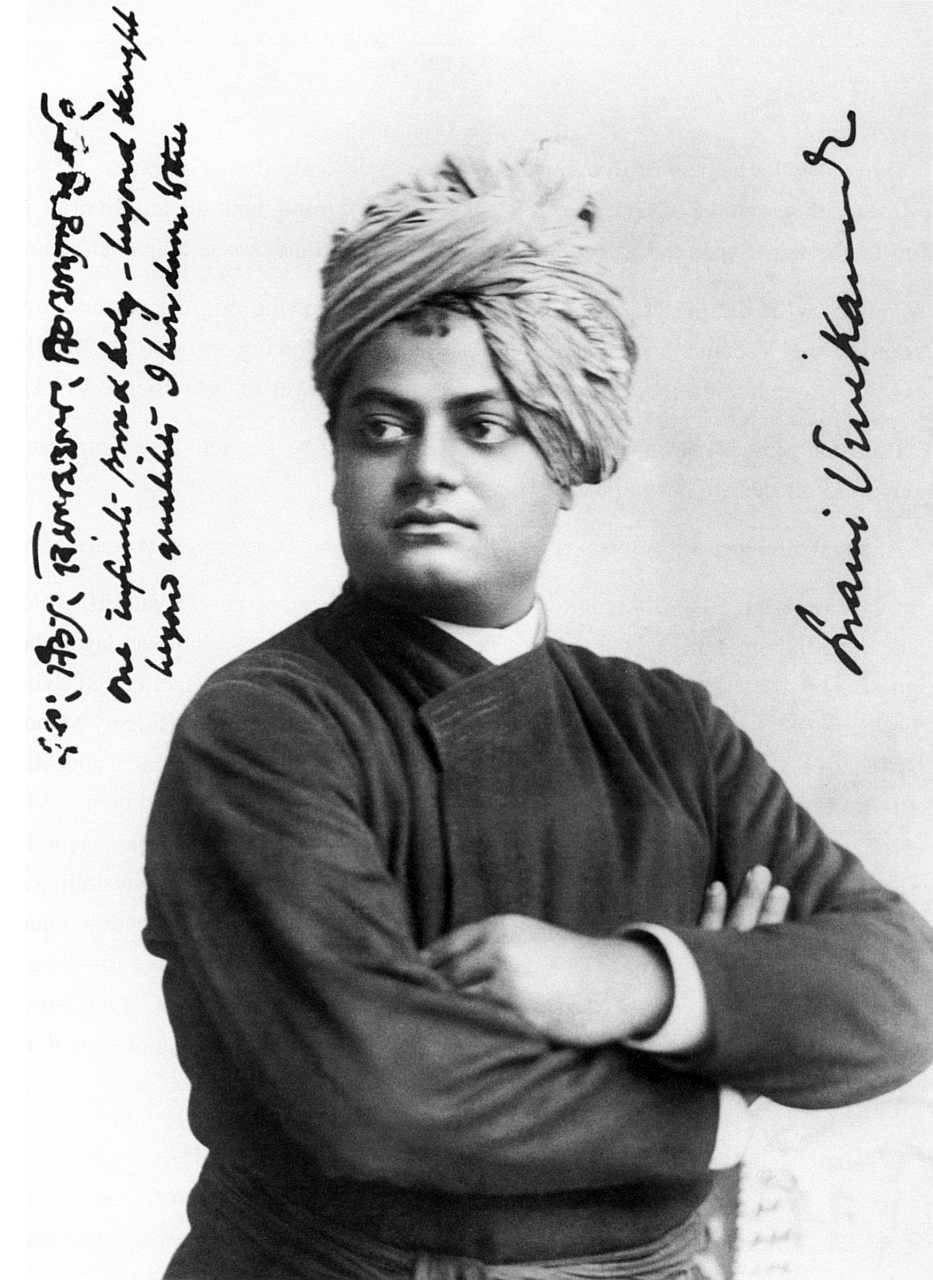
Vivekananda,
Vedanta-based

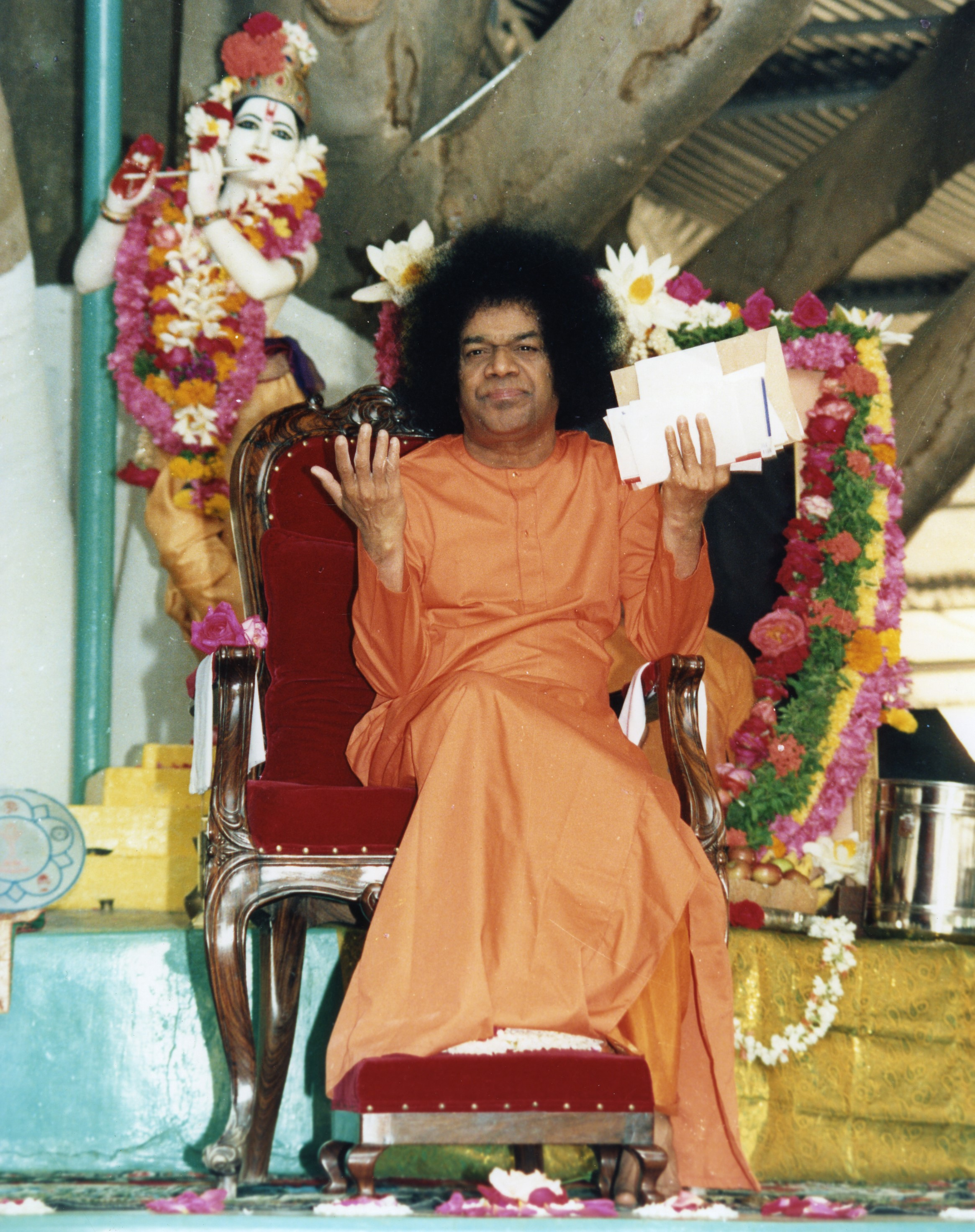
Sathya Sai Baba,
Tantra-based

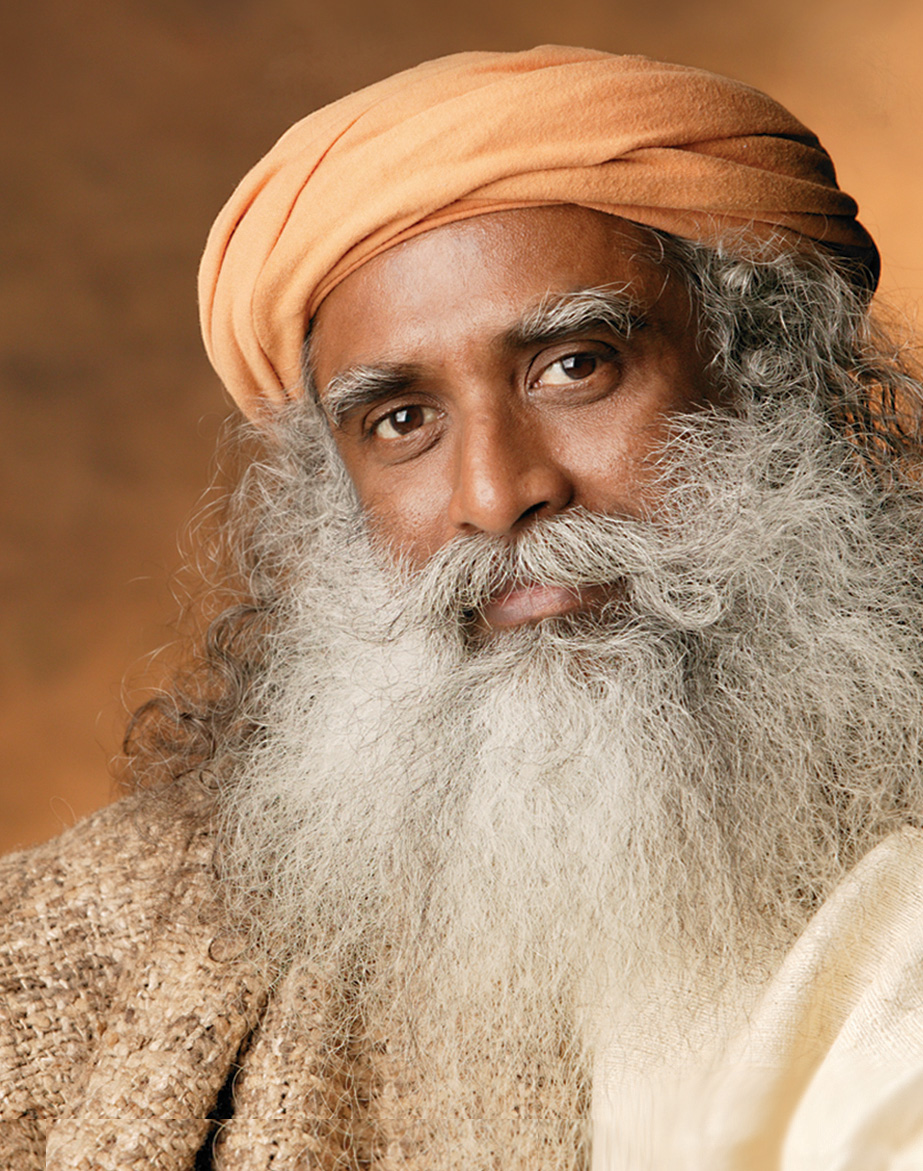
Jaggi Vasudev (Sadhguru),
"inner technology"

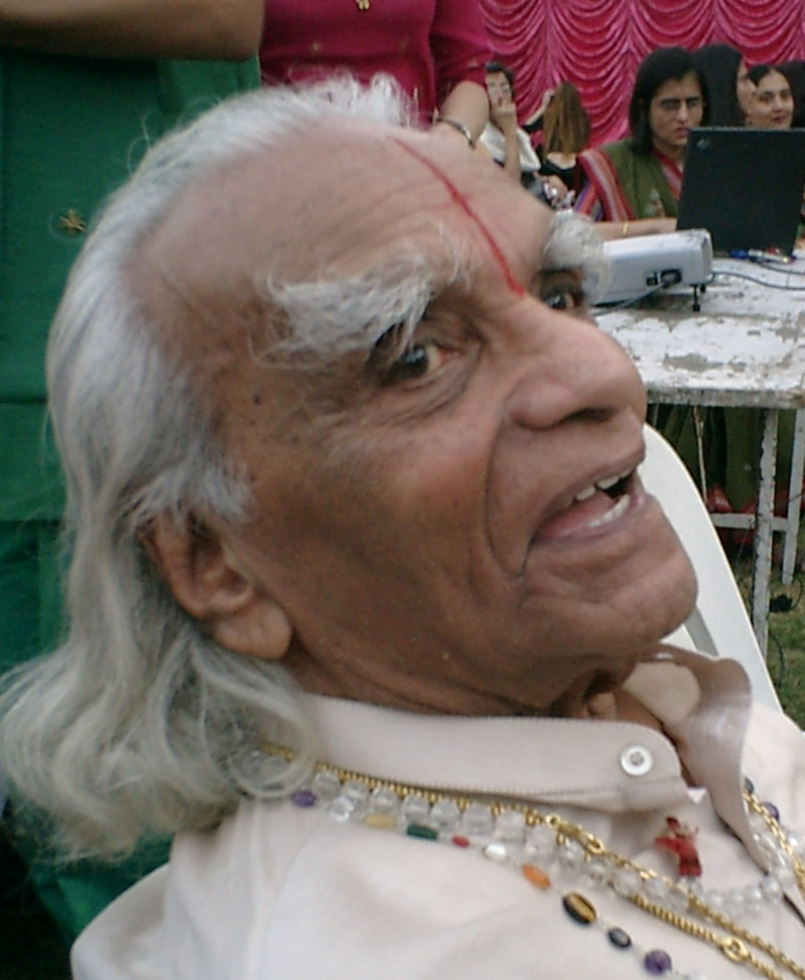
B. K. S. Iyengar
precise asanas

=== Cultural exchange and syncretism ===
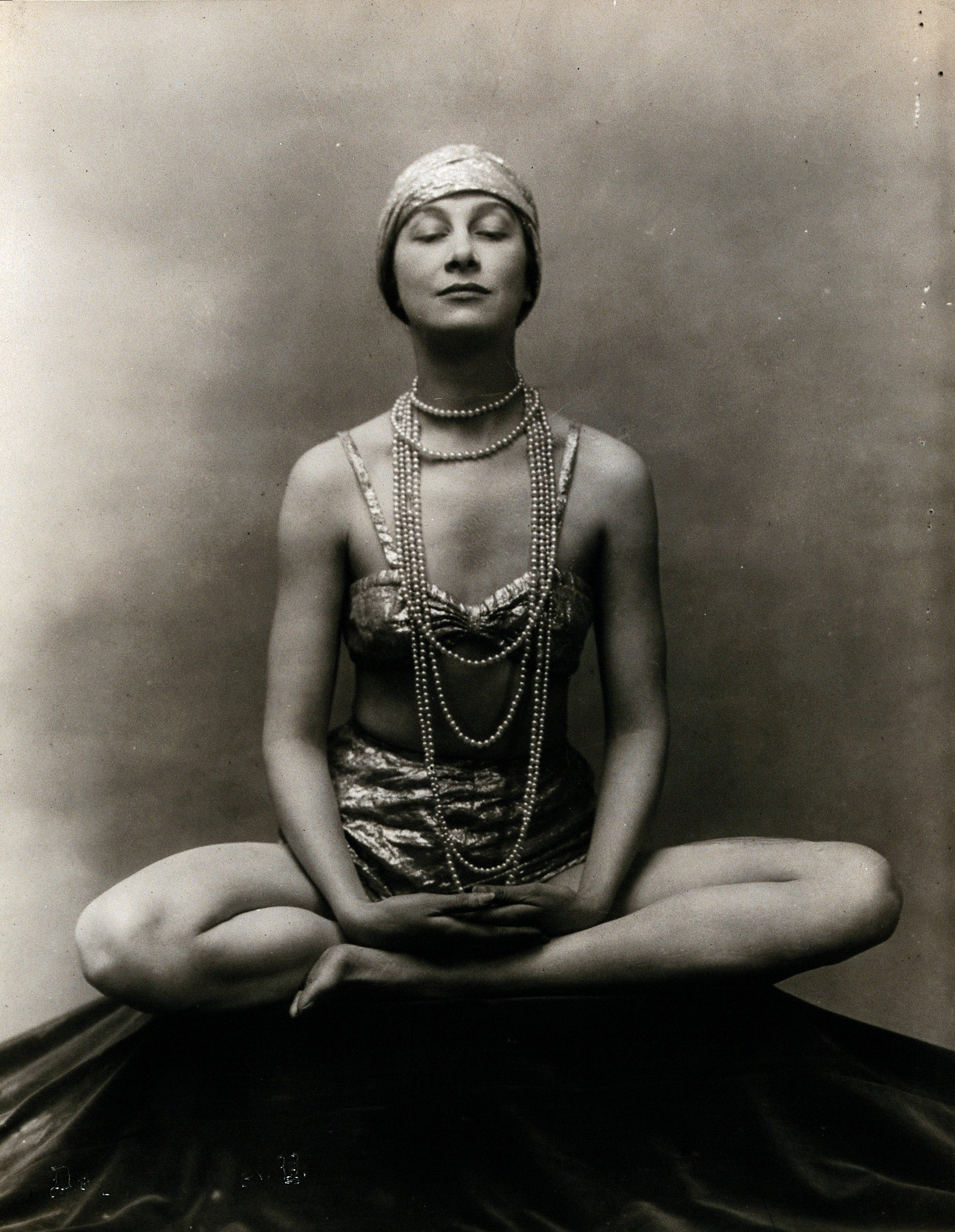
Anya Foxen uses this c. 1928 photograph of the actress and dancer Marguerite Agniel in "Buddha position" by John de Mirjian to illustrate her view that modern yoga involves both cultural exchange (Note: See for example Yoga and harmonial gymnastics.) and syncretism.

Suzanne Newcombe, a scholar of modern yoga, especially in Britain, writes that modern yoga's development included "a long history of transnational intercultural exchange", including between India and countries in the western world, whether or not it is an "outgrowth of Neo-Hinduism". It is seemingly torn between being a secular physical fitness activity sometimes called "hatha yoga" (not the similarly named medieval practice of Haṭha yoga), and a spiritual practice with historical roots in India. She noted that the historical, sociological, and anthropological aspects of modern yoga were starting to be researched.

The scholar of religion Anya Foxen writes that "modern postural yoga", especially in America, was created through a complicated process involving both cultural exchange and syncretism of disparate approaches. Among the many ingredients are the subtle body and various strands of Greek philosophy, Western esotericism, and wellness programs for women based on such things as the teaching system of François Delsarte and the harmonial gymnastics of Genevieve Stebbins.

=== A contested relationship to Hinduism ===
James Mallinson, a scholar of Sanskrit manuscripts and yoga, writes that modern yoga's relationship to Hinduism is complex and contested; some Christians have challenged its inclusion in school curricula on the grounds that it is covertly Hindu, while the "Take Back Yoga" campaign of the Hindu American Foundation has challenged attempts to "airbrush the Hindu roots of yoga" from modern manifestations. Modern yoga, he writes, uses techniques from "a wide range of traditions, many of which are clearly not Hindu at all". While yoga was integrated with Vedantic philosophy, "the first text to teach hathayoga says that it will work even for atheists, who ... did not believe in karma and rebirth".

== Sources ==
- Alter, Joseph (2004). Yoga in modern India: the body between science and philosophy. Princeton University Press. ISBN 978-0-691-11874-1. OCLC 53483558.
- De Michelis, Elizabeth (2004). A History of Modern Yoga: Patañjali and Western Esotericism. Continuum. ISBN 978-0-8264-8772-8. OCLC 51942410.
- Foxen, Anya P. (2020). Inhaling Spirit: Harmonialism, Orientalism, and the Western Roots of Modern Yoga. Oxford University Press. ISBN 978-0-19-008274-1.
- Goldberg, Elliott (2016). The Path of Modern Yoga : the history of an embodied spiritual practice. Inner Traditions. ISBN 978-1-62055-567-5. OCLC 926062252.
- Jain, Andrea (2015). Selling Yoga : from Counterculture to Pop culture. Oxford University Press. ISBN 978-0-19-939024-3. OCLC 878953765.
- Lucia, Amanda J. (2020). White Utopias: The Religious Exoticism of Transformational Festivals. University of California Press. ISBN 978-0-520-37695-3.
- Mallinson, James; Singleton, Mark (2017). Roots of Yoga. Penguin Books. ISBN 978-0-241-25304-5. OCLC 928480104.
- Mastalia, Francesco (2017). Yoga : the secret of life. Powerhouse Books. ISBN 978-1-57687-856-9. OCLC 971079999.
- Meade, Marion (1980). Madame Blavatsky: The Woman Behind the Myth. Putnam. ISBN 978-0-399-12376-4.
- Singleton, Mark (2010). Yoga Body: the origins of modern posture practice. Oxford University Press. ISBN 978-0-19-539534-1. OCLC 318191988.
- Singleton, Mark; Goldberg, Ellen (2014). Gurus of Modern Yoga. Oxford University Press. ISBN 978-0199938728.
- Wood, Ernest E. (2015) [1948]. Practical yoga, ancient and modern : being a new, independent translation of Patanjali's yoga aphorisms interpreted in the light of ancient and modern psychological knowledge and practical experience. Josephs Press [Wilshire Book Co, Rider and Co]. ISBN 978-1-4465-2820-4. OCLC 285464424.
