= Yoga and harmonial gymnastics =

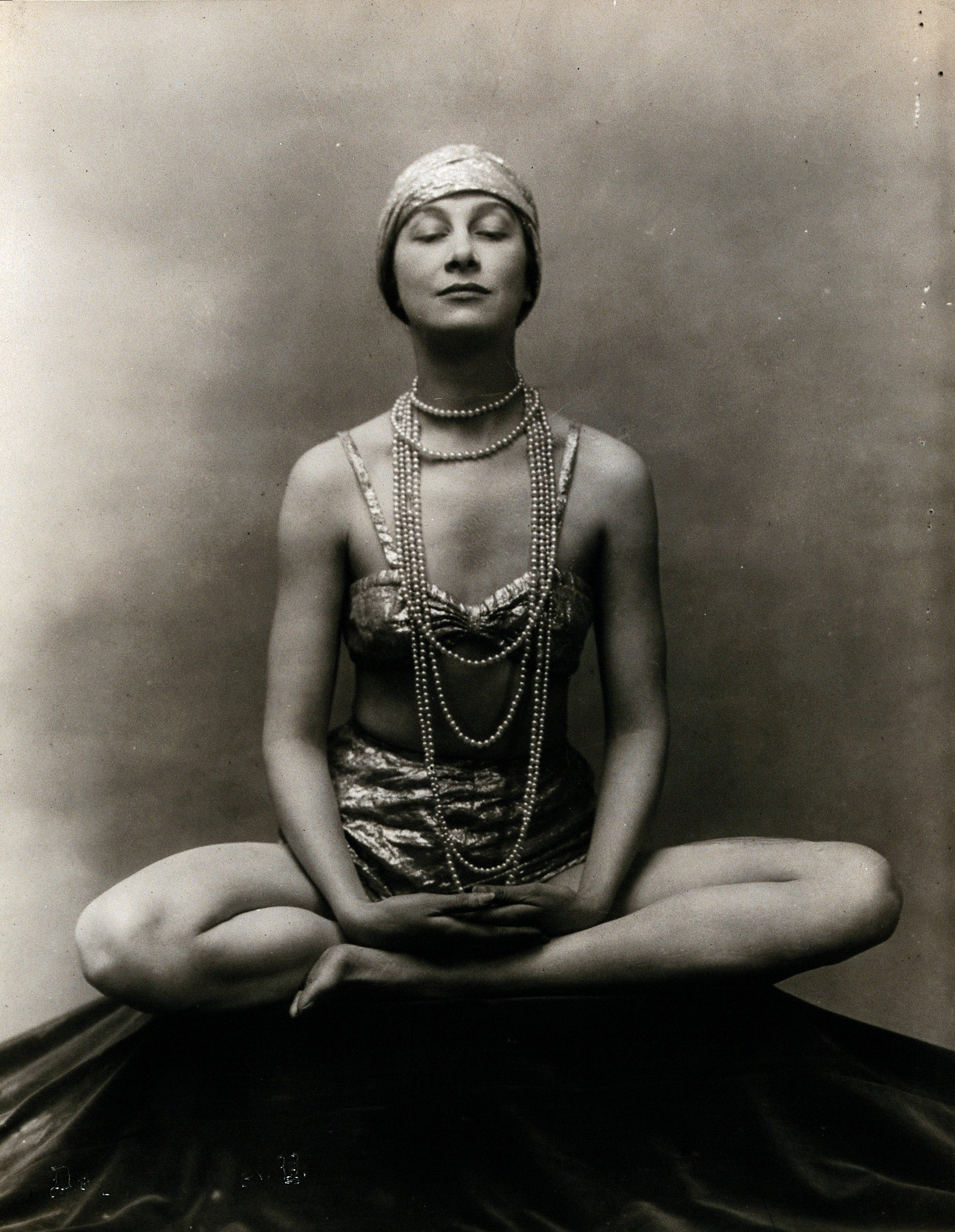
Marguerite Agniel in "Buddha position", c. 1928: modern postural yoga was created through cultural exchange and syncretism.

Harmonial gymnastics timeline
1100	Haṭha yoga using asanas
1834	Ling's aesthetic gymnastics
1839	François Delsarte's system
1871	MacKaye's American Delsarteism
1871	Genevieve Stebbins's system
1891	Annie Payson Call's system
1900s	Dalcroze eurhythmics
1931	Bagot Stack Stretch-and-Swing
1931	Marguerite Agniel's rhythmic exercise

Modern postural yoga (yoga as exercise) has roots in a Western tradition which can be described as "harmonialism". Especially in America, it was created through a complicated process involving both cultural exchange and syncretism of disparate approaches. Among its many components are methods of exercise for women based on 19th century systems including the aesthetic gymnastics of the Swedish Pehr Henrik Ling, and the system of movements of the French François Delsarte. Genevieve Stebbins, who incorporated both Ling and Delsarte into her teaching, created an influential system that she called "harmonic gymnastics"; it was paired with dynamic breathing, which she claimed was used by "Yogis of India". In the early 20th century, dancers like Ruth St. Denis became influential; she combined something close to postural yoga and what she knew of Indian dance, and taught what she called "yogi meditation" at her Denishawn school. Further systems appeared in the 20th century, including the Swiss Dalcroze eurhythmics, the British Mary Bagot Stack's "Stretch-and-Swing System", and the American Marguerite Agniel's "Rhythmic Exercise". These "harmonial gymnastics" systems often looked much like yoga, though they were not called that; and during the 20th century, they were largely replaced by yoga. Early advocates of yoga in the West, including Yogendra, Yogananda, and Indra Devi, related their teaching to the existing "harmonial" systems.

== Context ==
Yoga as exercise, also called modern postural yoga by academics, is a physical activity consisting mainly of postures (asanas), sometimes accompanied by breathing exercises, and frequently ending with relaxation lying down or meditation. Yoga in this form has become familiar across the world, especially in the US and Europe. It is partly derived from medieval haṭha yoga, which made use of similar postures. Yoga as exercise has been denounced as cultural appropriation, though the scholar of religion Andrea Jain writes that this ignores yoga's complex multinational history.

The scholar of yoga Mark Singleton writes in his 2010 book Yoga Body that modern postural yoga derives both from Indian physical and religious practices, especially medieval haṭha yoga, and from a variety of European styles of physical exercise devised in the 19th and 20th centuries. The scholar of religion Paul Bramadat writes that some yoga practitioners speak of being "spiritual but not religious", though there are multiple similarities between modern postural yoga and religion.

The anthropologist Sarah Strauss contrasts the goal of classical yoga, the isolation of the self or kaivalya, with the modern goals of good health, reduced stress, and physical flexibility. Norman Sjoman notes that many of the asanas in the yoga guru B. K. S. Iyengar's 1966 book Light on Yoga can be traced to his teacher, Krishnamacharya (1888–1989), "but not beyond him".

Modern postural yoga developed during the 20th century, influenced by Western philosophy and physical culture, and from Indian yoga, wrestlers' exercises, and Surya Namaskar. Women's harmonial gymnastics and the harmonial influences on it are highlighted.

== Definition of "harmonialism" ==
The idea of harmonia, cosmic harmony, is based ultimately on the writings of Pythagoras (c. 570 – c. 495 BC), and through him to Plato (c. 425 – c. 348 BC) in Ancient Greece. Plato and the Pythagoreans believed in a relationship between music and the soul; the body needed to be trained with gymnastics, while the soul required music and philosophy. The result was to put all the parts of a person into harmony.

Singleton writes that "postural modern yoga displaced—or was the cultural successor of—the established methods of stretching and relaxing that had already become commonplace in the West, through harmonial gymnastics and female physical culture." He states that he uses the term "harmonial gymnastics" for the tradition of Genevieve Stebbins, Annie Payson Call, (Note: For more on Call's influence on yoga, see Yoga nidra.) and Mary (Mollie) Bagot Stack. Both he and Anya Foxen follow Sydney Ahlstrom's usage "harmonial religion", for what Ahlstrom defines as "encompass[ing] those forms of piety and belief in which spiritual composure, physical health, and even economic well-being are understood to flow from a person's rapport with the cosmos." Foxen notes that Genevieve Stebbins named her system "'harmonic' rather than 'harmonial'", stating however that it is certain that Stebbins and Ahlstrom were "drawing on the same zeitgeist" in choosing their wording.

Foxen lists the core elements of "harmonialism" as:

1. "an explicit or tacit monism, which asserts that there is, in effect, only one kind of reality (elaborated according to a set of objectively, often mathematically determined principles), thereby rendering the material continuous with the immaterial, the physical with the spiritual, and the human with the divine;"
2. "an intermediary 'spiritual' reality (whether called pneuma, spiritus, spirit, ether, energy, or otherwise) that forms a sympathetic link between the human organism, the surrounding cosmos, and the divine reality that underlies both;"
3. "methods that utilize this connection so as to bring all three (human, cosmos, and the divine) into alignment or harmony for the benefit of body on the one hand and soul on the other."

Foxen states that she uses "harmonialism" for "a specific cultural strand ... that has profoundly influenced how practices such as yoga have been received and interpreted in the West." She writes that harmonialism is based on "a cosmology that posits the whole specifically in terms of mathematical proportion, and especially a musically based notion of harmony. This kind of language clues us in to an implicit or subconscious participation in the harmonial 'tradition'."

== Harmonial gymnastics ==
=== Aesthetic gymnastics ===
The Swedish gymnastics instructor Pehr Henrik Ling (1776–1839) created a system of light or aesthetic gymnastics, which he published in 1834. It introduced a metaphysical element to physical exercise; in George Herbert Taylor's words, it treated "man as a spiritual being". Ling's aesthetic gymnastics influenced systems of women's callisthenics, such as Catharine Beecher's (1800–1878) approach.

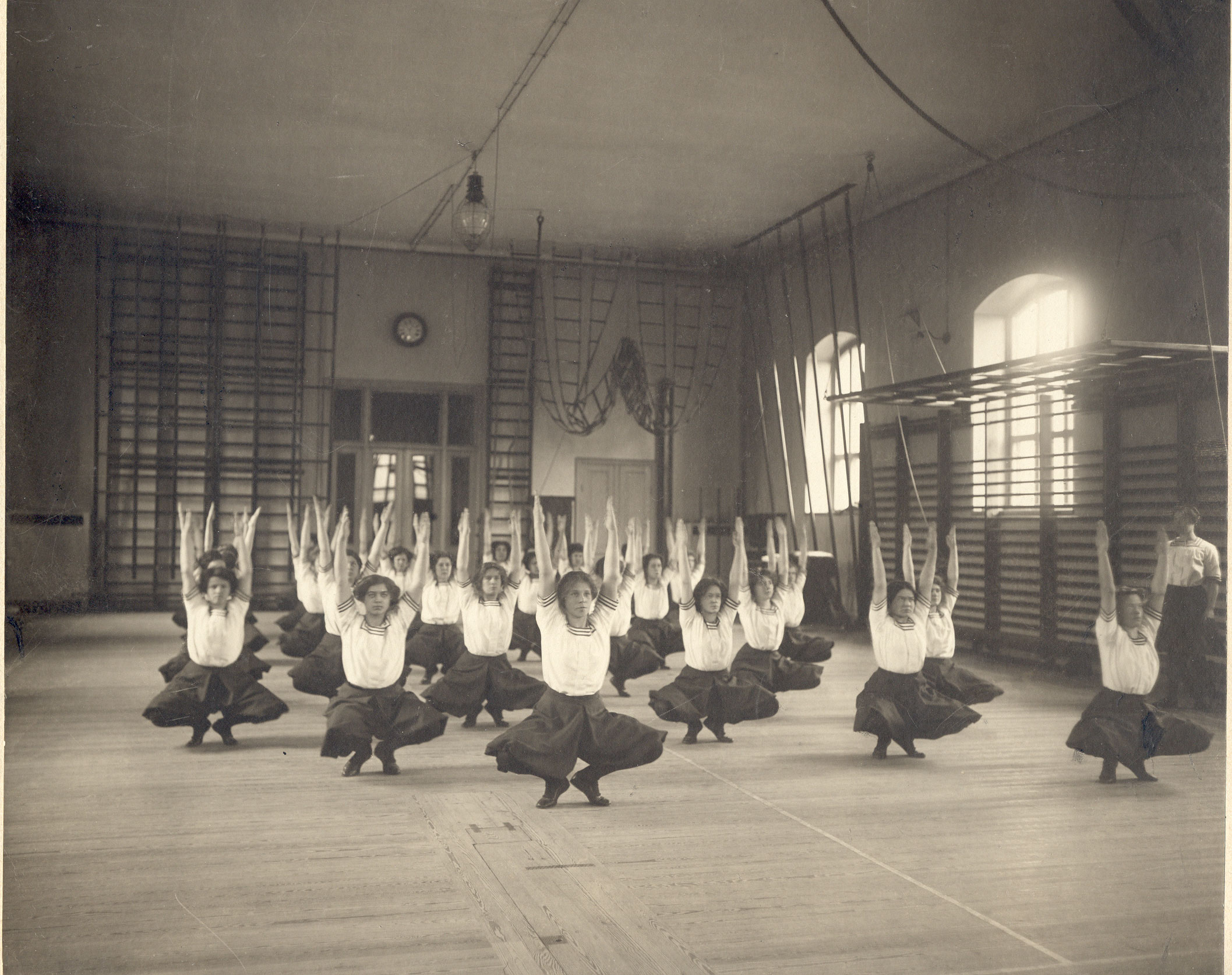
Ling gymnastics at the Gymnastic Central Institute, Stockholm, c. 1910

=== Delsarteism ===
The French teacher of singing and declamation François Delsarte's (1811–1871) system of movements became popular in America around 1900. American Delsarteism, developed by the playwright Steele MacKaye (1842–1894) for use by actors, offered women a system of ritual and harmonial movement for bodily expression. MacKaye combined the systems of Delsarte and Ling, which already shared some similarities. Some 400 American performers or teachers, mainly women, claimed to be Delsartean. American Delsarteism was committed to a Greek aesthetics, extending to "statue posing" in a Greek style. Elsie Wilbor's 1890 Delsarte Recitation Book and Directory called for "care [to be] taken to make the transitions [between poses] without losing in any degree a perfect and harmonious poise of the body, and the graceful, sinuous curves of the body and limbs." Foxen remarks the evident parallels with the flowing transitions in vinyasa yoga styles; Singleton likens the intensity of "the veritable Delsarte craze" to 21st century enthusiasm for yoga.

An American system influenced by Delsarteism was Mrs John Bailey's 1892 Physical Culture. She advocated a session of light callisthenics, preceded by a period of relaxation, and accompanied by rhythmic breathing. A similar system by Mary Taylor Bissell, described in her 1891 Physical Development and Exercise for Women, included the use of props, which Bailey avoided. Marion Lowell's 1895 Harmonic Gymnastics and Pantomimic Expression is, Foxen suggests, likely close to MacKaye's "aesthetic gymnastics", without emphasis on the breath.

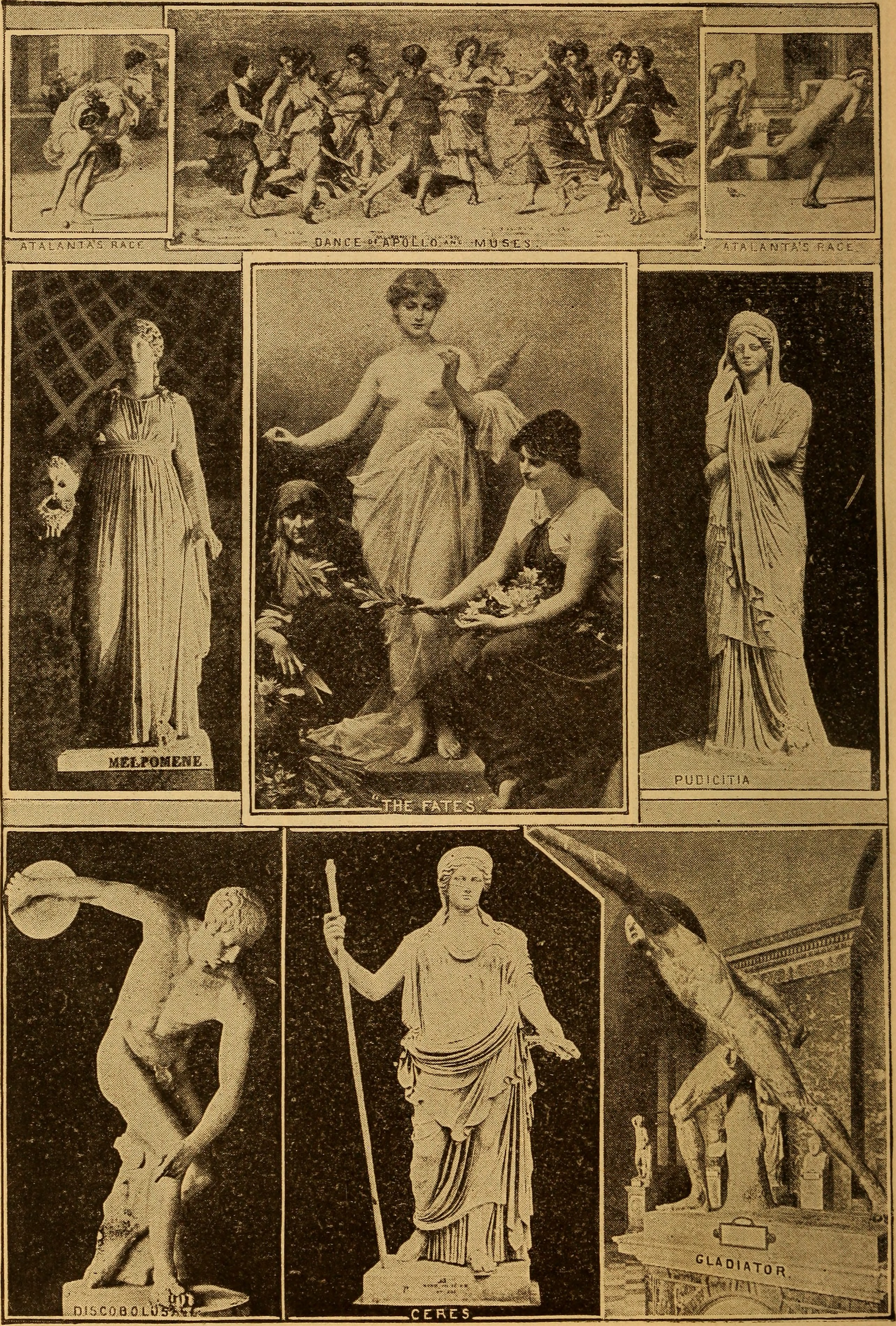
Plate in the chapter "Hints for Statue-Poses" in Elsie Wilbor's 1890 Delsarte Recitation Book and Directory

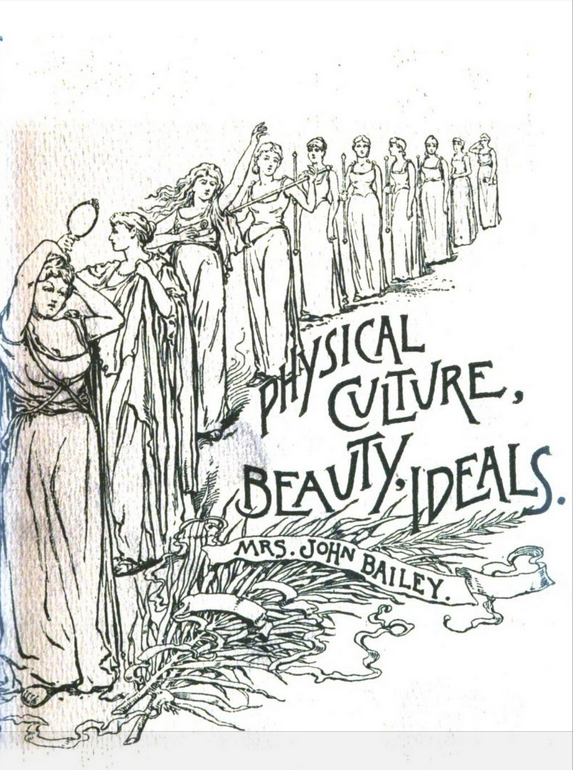
Physical Culture by Mrs John Bailey, 1892

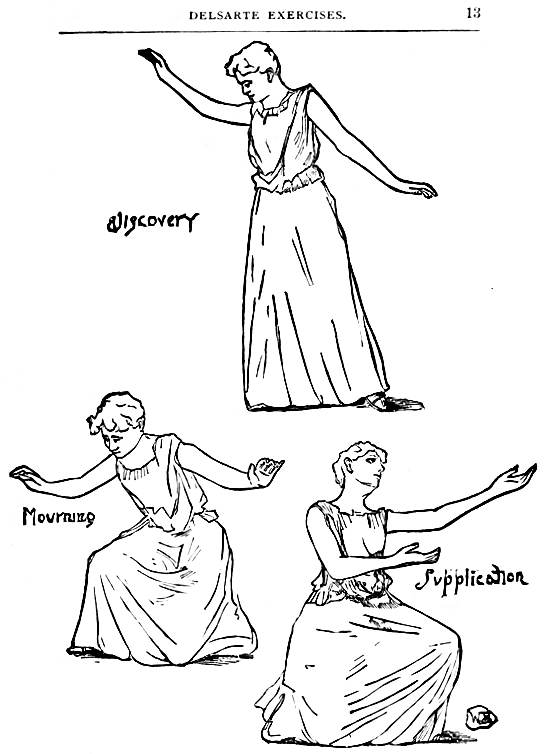
Greek style: Delsarte exercises in Pastimes at Home and School, 1897

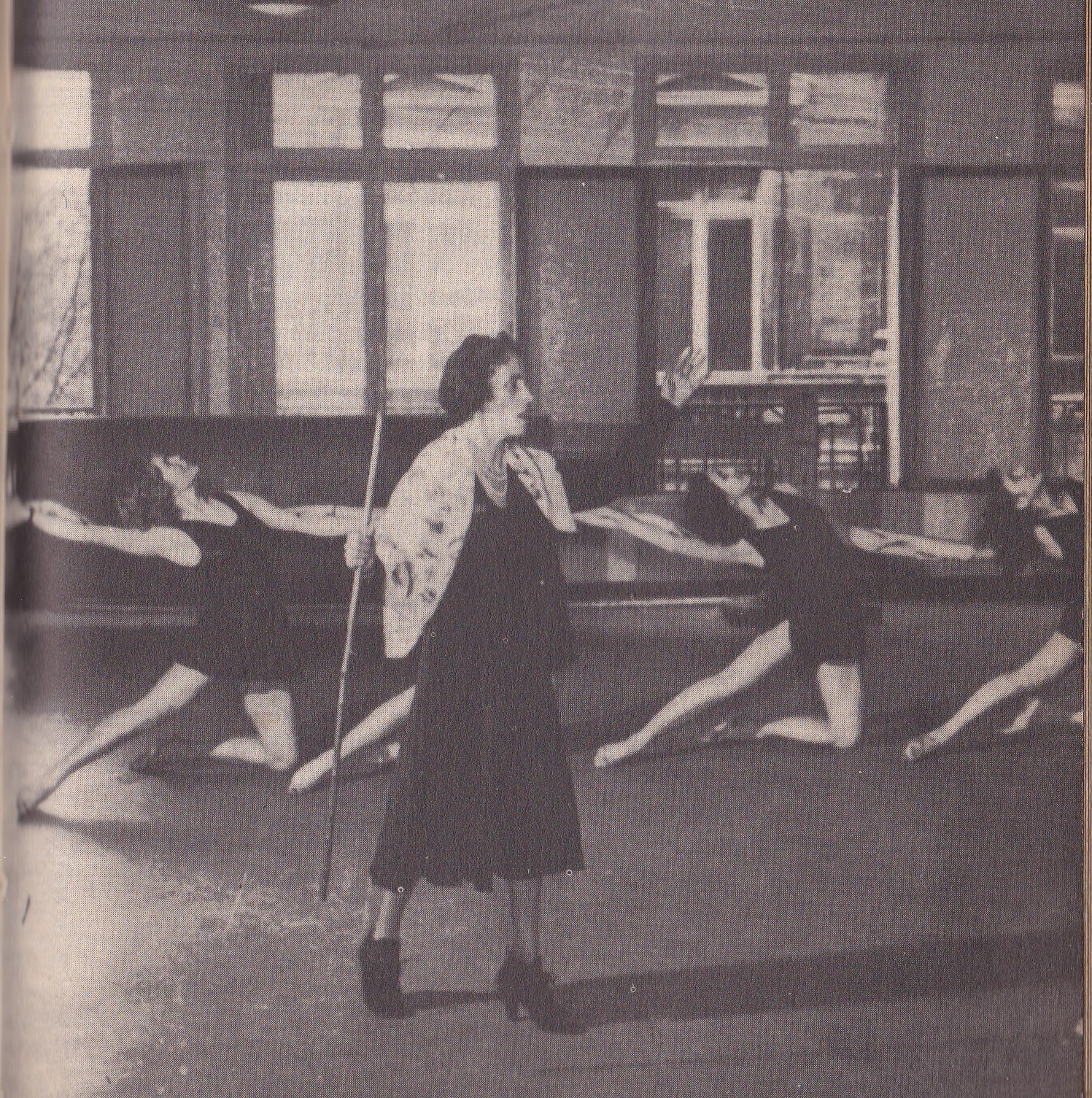
Irène Popard teaching "harmonic gymnastics", Paris, 1950

=== Breath and body ===
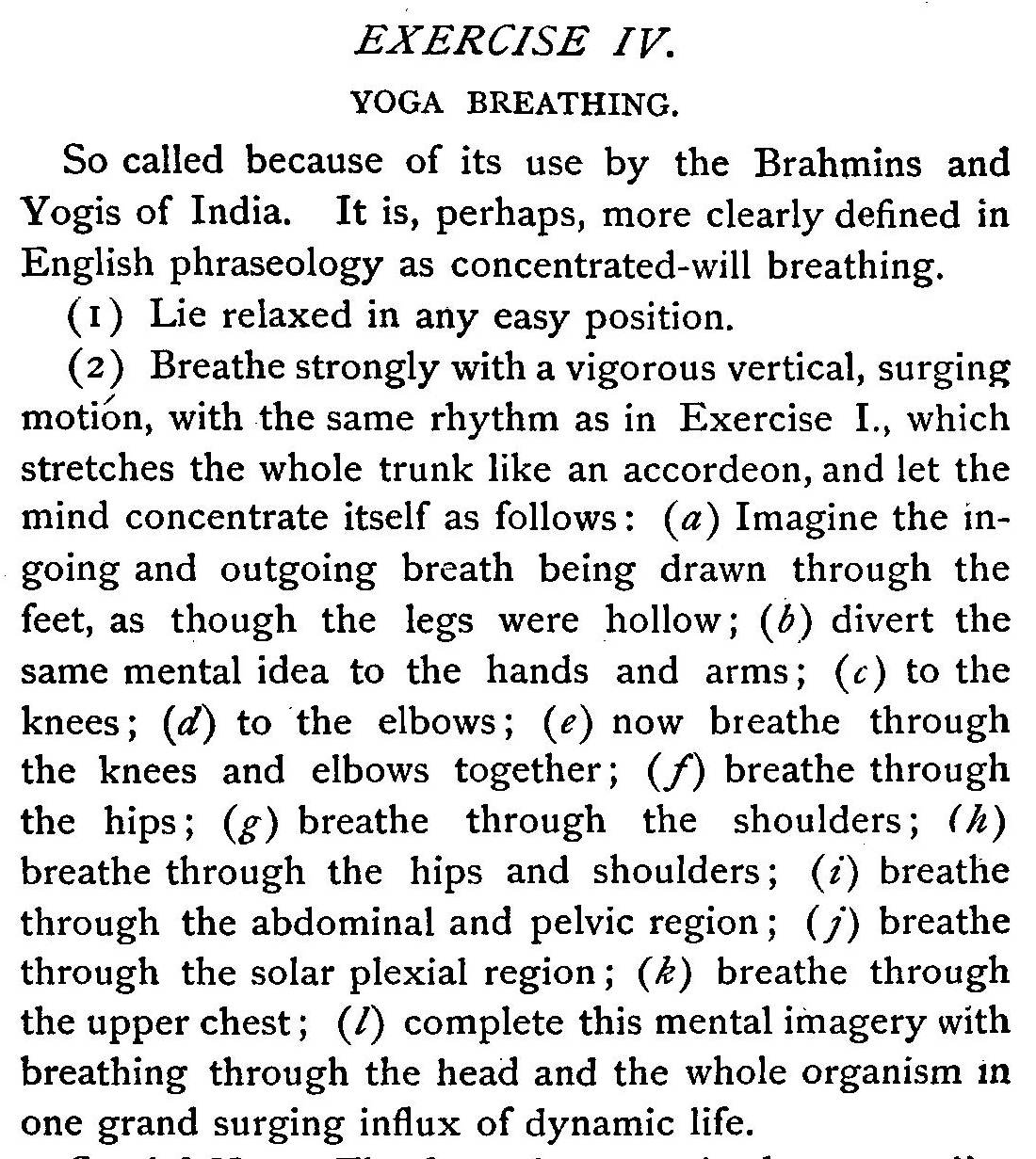
Dynamic breathing: "Yoga Breathing" exercise by Genevieve Stebbins, 1892

Genevieve Stebbins (1857–1934) incorporated Ling, "oriental dance", and American Delsarteism (without exactly claiming to be Delsartian) into her system of "harmonic gymnastics". She explained that "These exercises free the channels of expression, and the current of nervous force can thus rush through them as a stream of water rushes through a channel, unclogged by obstacles. We name these exercises decomposing." Foxen comments that this implied a purification of the body to allow it full harmonic expression. Stebbins further paired her harmonic gymnastics with "dynamic breathing" to form a system of "psycho-physical culture". She described all this as "a completely rounded system for the development of body, brain, and soul".

Another system like Stebbins's was Annie Payson Call's (1853–1940). Her 1891 book Power Through Repose describes a system that combines "relaxationism", breathwork, and light gymnastics. Singleton suggests that both systems, with their use of stretching and breath to achieve "'spiritual' relaxation", served to prepare the ground for people to think of "yoga as another means to stretch and relax" (his emphasis).

Warren Felt Evans (1817–1889) combined Ling's aesthetic gymnastics with Emanuel Swedenborg's spiritual system. It foreshadowed both Delsarteism and several other harmonial physical culture approaches. More widely, the New Thought movement sought to address the connection of mind and body. A key aspect of this connection is a yoga-like focus on the breath to accompany movement of the body.

Towards the end of the 19th century, authors including Bailey and Evans began to allude, sometimes vaguely and inaccurately, to Eastern religion and philosophy. In 1892, Stebbins a little more precisely called one of her exercises "yoga breathing". In Singleton's view, her system of breathing was directly connected to pranayama, noting that she explained that it was "so called because it is used by the Brahmins and Yogis of India". Foxen disagrees, as Stebbins's breath exercises were performed lying down, unlike the seated asanas used in haṭha yoga's pranayama breath control; nor does it make use of the alternate nostril breathing popularised in North America by Vivekananda. All the same, in Foxen's view, Stebbins had transformed "American Delsarteism ... from ... a theologized language of expression into a full-blown spiritual practice encompassing both breath and movement."

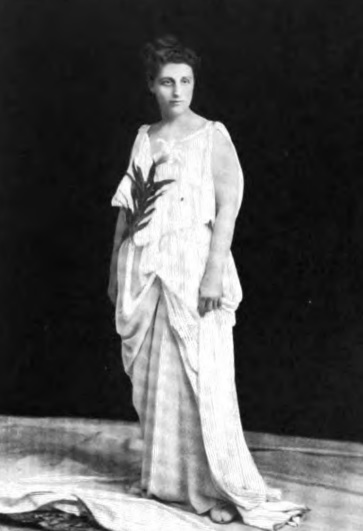
Genevieve Stebbins incorporated American Delsarteism into her system of "harmonic gymnastics".

== Towards a harmonial yoga ==
=== Yoga and modern dance ===
Stebbins's approach shaped two founders of modern dance: the Indian-style "nautch girl" Ruth St. Denis (1879–1968), and the choreographer Isadora Duncan (1877–1927) who embodied Delsarteism's neoclassical aesthetic. St. Denis was familiar with Stebbins's writings, and was influenced by seeing a group of Indian dancers at Coney Island, most likely of the classical North Indian Kathak form, in 1904, two years before her solo debut, playing the Hindu goddess Radha (consort of Krishna). Foxen suggests that in St. Denis's mind, Indian dance and yoga were interwoven. In her view, St. Denis's work came close to "something like contemporary Indian postural yoga both in actuality and in spirit." In 1915, St. Denis was teaching "yogi meditation" at her Denishawn school in Los Angeles, where she invited Swami Paramananda to lead a meditation. She felt that both she and Duncan were trying "to fuse certain elements of life and movement into a deeper identification with the natural expressions of being".

By the 1910s, Western women in high society had adopted forms of gymnastics resembling dance for exercise, in place of Delsarteism. One such form was the Swiss composer Émile Jaques-Dalcroze (1865–1950)'s Dalcroze eurhythmics, using music and movement; it was clearly in the same tradition of "lightly metaphysical gymnastics", and had something in common with Duncan's dance method. Another form was what was called "oriental dance", though it only superficially resembled anything from the East.

Later in her career, in the 1930s, St. Denis met an Indian practitioner of postural yoga, Mr Mehta, and was impressed by his flowing movements combined with use of the breath. Her belief in the close relationship between breath, body, and spirit communicated itself to her pupils, including the modern dancer and choreographer Martha Graham. Her work embodied both the exotically Indian (which Graham came to reject) and the harmonial.

Meanwhile, the actress and dancer Marguerite Agniel (1891–c. 1971), trained in the Dalcroze method and in St. Denis's school, was writing about beauty and fitness for American women in Vogue and later other magazines including Physical Culture. Her 1931 book The Art of the Body: Rhythmic Exercise for Health and Beauty contains several poses that closely resemble asanas in modern postural yoga. Foxen comments that the seated poses, like her 'Buddha position', are based on (American) 'oriental dance', and any mentions of yoga are at best vague, with a "rather bizarre amalgamation" of influences. Overall, though, her gymnastics is clearly harmonial.

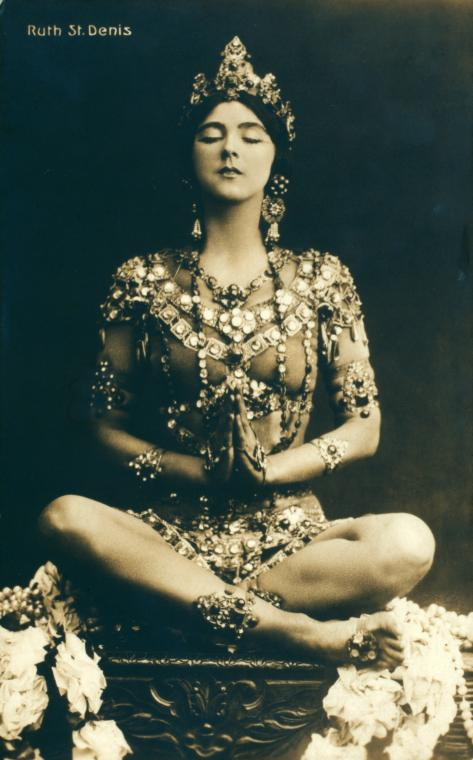
Ruth St. Denis
as the Hindu goddess Radha,
c. 1906

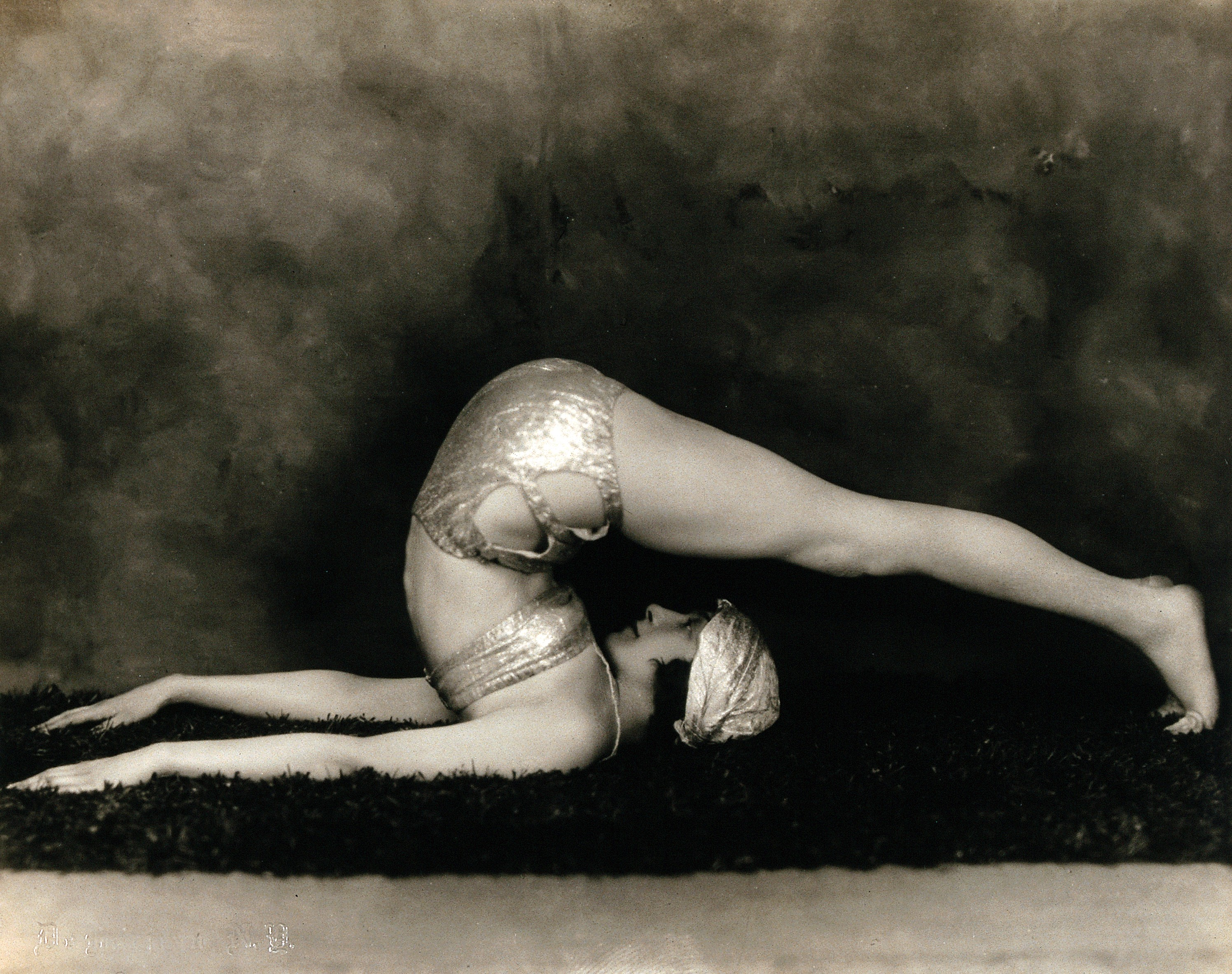
Marguerite Agniel in a posture close to Halasana, plough pose, c. 1928

At the same time in Britain, Mary Bagot Stack (1883–1935) was teaching yoga-like postures to the Women's League of Health and Beauty in her "Bagot Stack Stretch-and-Swing System". She had travelled to India, and had learnt some yoga poses there.

Singleton commented that "women during the 1930s commonly engaged in much the same forms of bodily activity that they do today under the name of yoga". Foxen suggests that instead, white women in the 1890s did something much like modern postural yoga, but it was not called yoga; whereas by the 1930s it was starting to be called yoga.

Women's activities were often like yoga before being so called

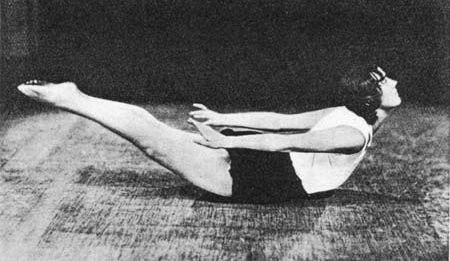
Mary Bagot Stack in Stretch-and-Swing's "Seal" posture, 1931

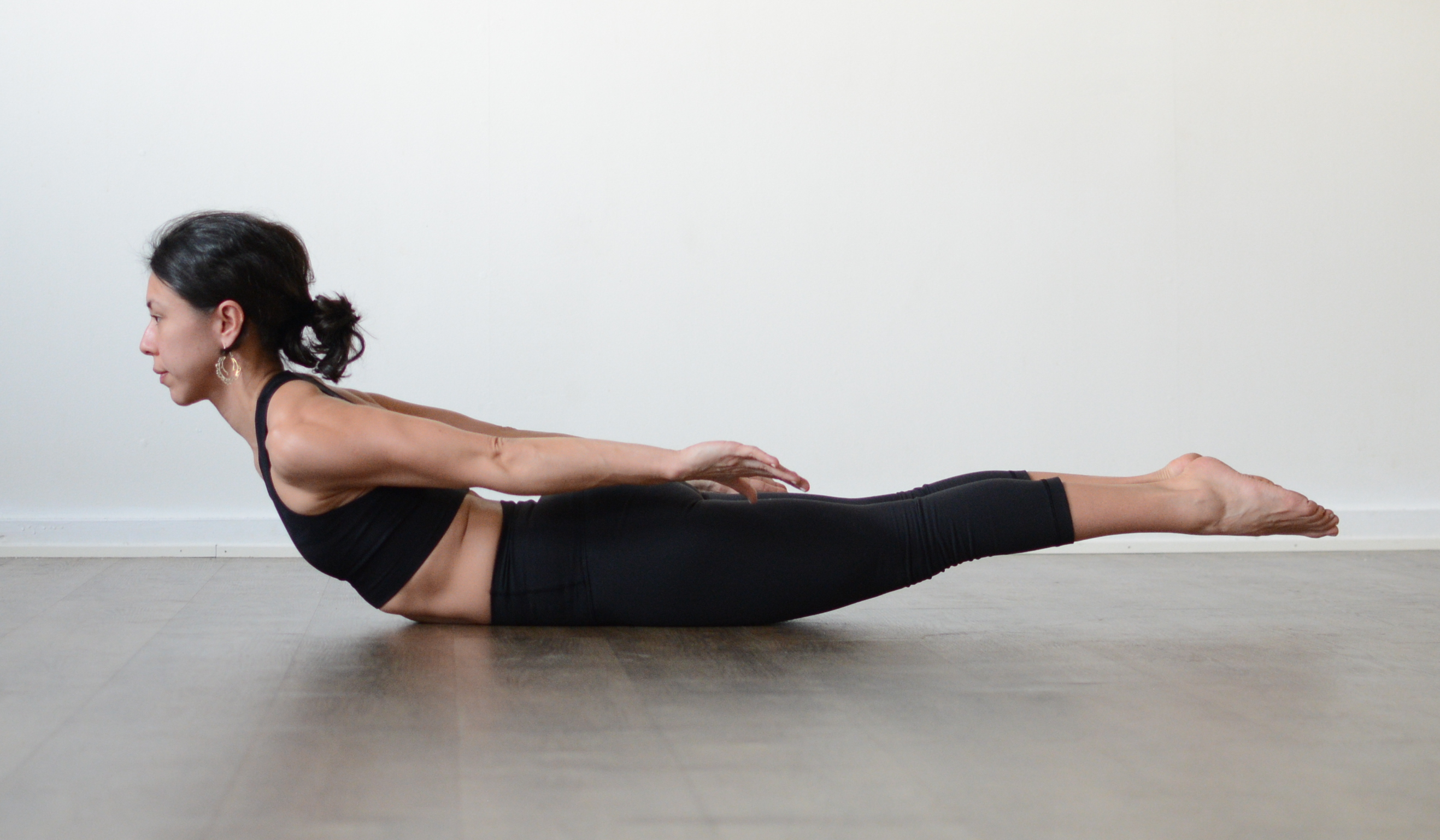
Salabhasana, locust pose in modern postural yoga

=== Yoga and harmony ===
Postural yoga in the West resembles the harmonial gymnastics that preceded it, and appears to have been influenced by it.

In 1920, Yogananda arrived in the United States, teaching Kriya yoga, a form of yoga that makes use of pranayama breath control, repetition of mantras, and mudra (gestures); it was quite different from the vague ideas of yoga that had been current in the West. His "Yogoda" program, however, incorporated callisthenic exercises based on Western physical culture (tracing back to Pehr Henrik Ling) for mass consumption, even though he taught asanas to his close followers. Yogananda's system was likely based on the physical culture of the Danish strongman Jørgen Peter Müller and the German Maxick, and, Foxen suggests, perhaps Stebbins's as well given Yogoda's spiritual aspect and use of specific phrases like "beauty of form" and "grace of expression"; or it might be Delsarteism more generally.

Vivekananda too had avoided asanas, except for adopting a seated position for meditation, though his use of breathwork can be described as a physical practice. In Singleton's view, as far as breathing techniques are concerned, Vivekananda's "'prāṇa model' in [his book] Raja Yoga ... bears an arresting similarity to the diction and content of Stebbins's system."

Yogendra (1897–1989) came to New York in 1919, setting up the Yoga Institute of America at Harriman. His yoga, however, was a system of asanas and "yoga breathing" (pranayama), both of which he related to Western physical culture. He discussed breathing with respect to Stebbins, and his system included "harmony" as an objective. His emphasis on breathing rhythmically in time with the body's movement recalls Stebbins, with roots in the harmonial physical culture systems of Delsarte and Dalcroze.

Indra Devi (1899–2002) helped to popularise modern postural yoga through her celebrity pupils in Hollywood from 1948. She taught asanas and pranayama, avoiding spiritual teaching, to men as well as women, though in Elliott Goldberg's view she presented yoga for women as a "beauty secret, youth elixir, and health tonic". Foxen sees in Devi's writings "a blurring between yoga's Indian roots and its adaptation into a harmonial context." She alludes to prana and kundalini, while emphasising that yoga is not just about developing muscles, but "the functions of the entire organism", or as Foxen concludes "In other words, harmony".

Cajzoran Ali (1903–?) taught postural yoga in the US from 1928, and in France from 1935. She published many articles on harmonial hatha yoga for women, advocating a combination of postures and "Breath Culture". Singleton comments that this both aligned with the women's gymnastics of the time, and foreshadowed late 20th century New Age postural yoga.

Foxen writes that postural yoga is "often harmonial in its basic assumptions", explaining that practitioners find nothing contradictory in having a religion like Christianity, a scientific outlook, and the practice of yoga: "Harmony in the whole, sympathy in the parts."

== Sources ==
=== Primary ===
- Agniel, Marguerite (1931). The Art of the Body: Rhythmic Exercise for Health and Beauty. Batsford.
- Ali, Cajzoran (pseudonym) (1928). Divine Posture Influence upon Endocrine Glands. New York: Cajzoran Ali.
- Ahlstrom, Sydney (1972). A Religious History of the American People. Yale University Press.
- Bailey, Mrs John (1892). Physical Culture. New York: Press of J.J. Little.
- Bissell, Mary Taylor (1891). Physical Development and Exercise for Women. New York: Dodd, Mead, and Company.
- Call, Annie Payson (1891). Power Through Repose. London: S. Low, Marston.
- Lowell, Marion (1895). Harmonic Gymnastics and Pantomimic Expression. Boston: Marion Lowell.
- Stack, Mary Bagot (1931). Building the body beautiful: The Bagot Stack stretch-and-swing system (1 ed.). Chapman & Hall. p. 71.
- Stebbins, Genevieve (1892). Dynamic Breathing and Harmonic Gymnastics: A Complete System of Psychical Aesthetic and Physical Culture. New York: E.S. Werner.
- Vivekananda (1920) [1896]. Raja Yoga. New York: Brentano's.
- Wilbor, Elsie M. (1890). Delsarte Recitation Book and Directory. New York: Edgar S. Werner.

=== Secondary ===
- Caycedo, Alfonso (1966). India of Yogis. National Publishing House, the University of Michigan.
- Bramadat, Paul (2025). Yogalands. Montreal: McGill–Queen's University Press. ISBN 978-0-2280-2374-6.
- De Michelis, Elizabeth (2004). A History of Modern Yoga: Patañjali and Western Esotericism. Continuum International Publishing Group. ISBN 978-0-8264-8772-8. OCLC 51942410.
- Foxen, Anya P. (2020). Inhaling Spirit: Harmonialism, Orientalism, and the Western Roots of Modern Yoga. Oxford University Press. ISBN 978-0-19-008274-1.
- Goldberg, Elliott (2016). The Path of Modern Yoga: the history of an embodied spiritual practice. Rochester, Vermont: Inner Traditions. pp. 338–363. ISBN 978-1-62055-567-5.
- Gongaki, Konstantina I.; Kapranos, Stavros (19 July 2021). "Music and Gymnastic harmonization under the viewpoint of the platonic meaning of life". Epistēmēs Metron Logos (6): 7. doi:10.12681/eml.27216. ISSN 2585-2973.
- Jain, Andrea R. (2015). Selling Yoga: from Counterculture to Pop Culture. Oxford University Press. ISBN 978-0-19-939024-3. OCLC 878953765.
- Newcombe, Suzanne (2017). "The Revival of Yoga in Contemporary India" (PDF). Religion. 1. doi:10.1093/acrefore/9780199340378.013.253. ISBN 978-0-19-934037-8.
- Singleton, Mark (2005). "Salvation through Relaxation: Proprioceptive Therapy and its Relationship to Yoga". Journal of Contemporary Religion. 20 (3): 289–304. doi:10.1080/13537900500249780. S2CID 144625589.
- Singleton, Mark (2010). "Yoga as Physical Culture II: Harmonial Gymnastics and Esoteric Dance". Yoga Body: the origins of modern posture practice. Oxford University Press. ISBN 978-0-19-539534-1. OCLC 318191988.
- Singleton, Mark (2013). "Transnational Exchange and the Genesis of Modern Postural Yoga". In Beatrix Hauser (ed.). Yoga Traveling: Bodily Practice in Transcultural Perspective. Springer. ISBN 978-3-319-00315-3.
- Sjoman, Norman E. (1999) [1996]. The Yoga Tradition of the Mysore Palace (2nd ed.). Abhinav Publications. ISBN 81-7017-389-2.
- Strauss, Sarah (2005). Positioning Yoga: balancing acts across cultures. Berg. ISBN 978-1-85973-739-2. OCLC 290552174.
- Syman, Stefanie (2010). The Subtle Body: The Story of Yoga in America. New York: Farrar, Straus, and Giroux. pp. 179-197. ISBN 978-0-374-23676-2.
