= Yoga nidra =

State of consciousness between waking and sleeping

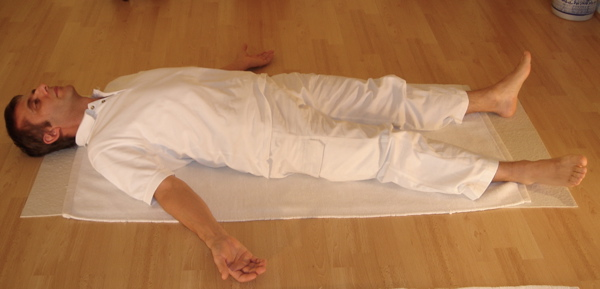
Shavasana, the usual pose for the practice of yoga nidra

Yoga nidra (Sanskrit: योग निद्रा, romanized: yoga nidrā) or yogic sleep in modern usage is a state of consciousness between waking and sleeping, typically induced by a guided meditation.

A state called yoga nidra is mentioned in the Upanishads and the Mahabharata, while a goddess named Yoganidrā appears in the Devīmāhātmya. Yoga nidra is linked to meditation in Shaiva and Buddhist tantras, while some medieval hatha yoga texts use "yoganidra" as a synonym for the deep meditative state of samadhi. These texts, however, offer no precedent for the modern technique of guided meditation. That derives from 19th- and 20th-century Western "proprioceptive relaxation", as described by practitioners such as Annie Payson Call and Edmund Jacobson.

The modern form of the technique, pioneered by Dennis Boyes in 1973, made widely known by Satyananda Saraswati in 1976, and then by Swami Rama, Richard Miller, and others has spread worldwide. It is applied by the U.S. Army to assist soldiers' recovery from post-traumatic stress disorder. There is some scientific evidence to support yoga nidra across clinical and academic disciplines, including the neurosciences and psychology.

== Historical usage ==
=== Ancient times ===
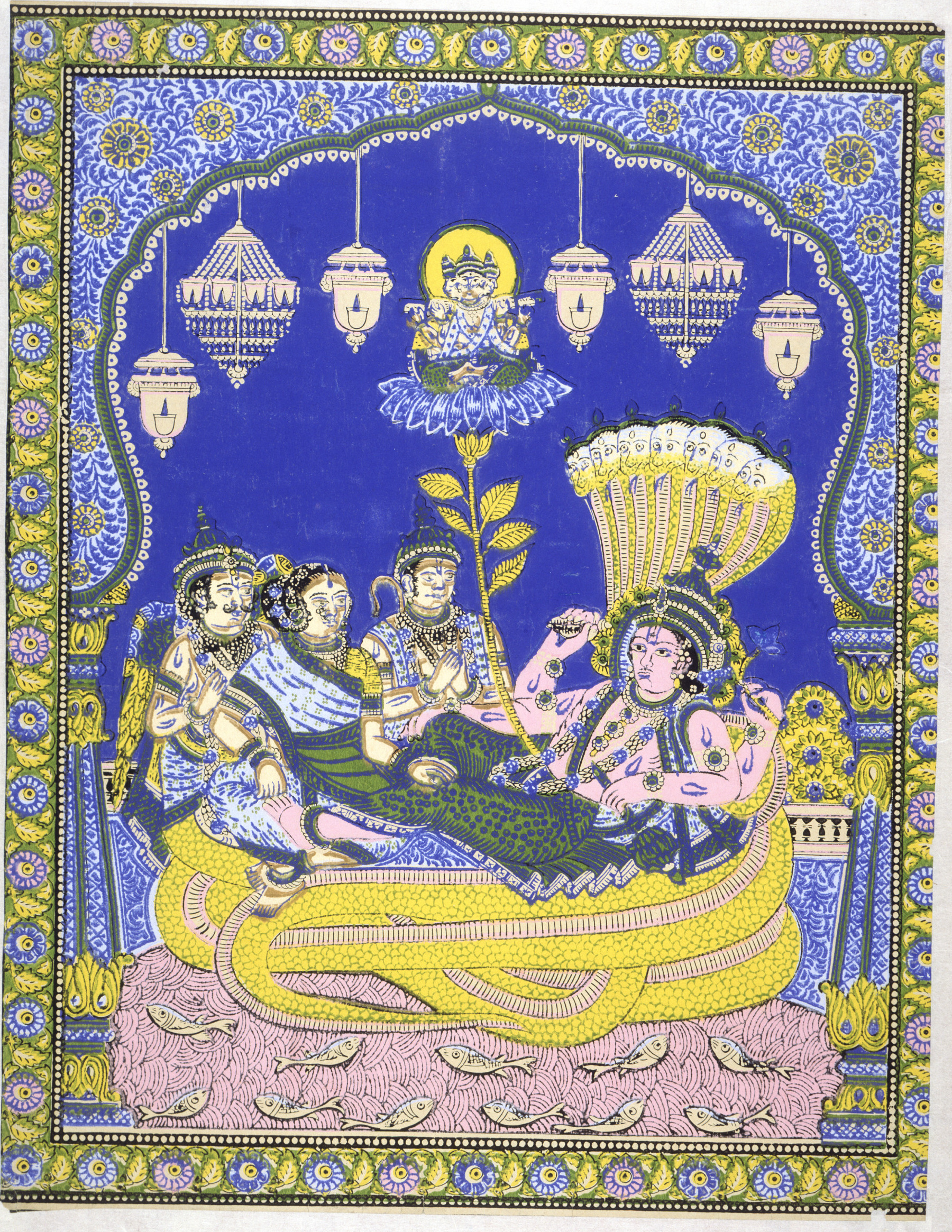
Vishnu asleep on the eternal waters, 19th century

The Hindu epic Mahabharata, completed by the 3rd century CE, mentions a state called "yoganidra", and associates it with Lord Vishnu:

[The Ocean] becomes the bed of the lotus-naveled Vishnu when at the termination of every Yuga that deity of immeasurable power enjoys yoga-nidra, the deep sleep under the spell of spiritual meditation.

— Mahabharata, Book 1, section XXI

The Devīmāhātmya, written around the 6th century CE, mentions a goddess whose name is Yoganidrā. The God Brahma asks Yoganidrā to wake up Vishnu to go and fight the Asuras or demigods named Madhu and Kaitabha. These early mentions do not define any yoga technique or practice, but describe the God Vishnu's transcendental sleep in between the Yugas, the cycles of the universe, and the manifestation of the goddess as sleep itself.

=== Medieval practices ===
Yoganidra is first linked to meditation in Shaiva and Buddhist tantras. In the Shaiva text Ciñcinīmatasārasamuccaya (7.164), yoganidra is called "peace beyond words"; in the Mahāmāyātantra (2.19ab) it is named as a state in which perfected Buddhas may access secret knowledge. In the 11th or 12th century, yoganidra is first used in Hatha yoga and Raja yoga texts as a synonym for samadhi, a deep state of meditative consciousness where the yogi no longer thinks, moves, or breathes. The Amanaska (2.64) asserts that "Just as someone who has suddenly arisen from sleep becomes aware of sense objects, so the yogi wakes up from that [world of sense objects] at the end of his yogic sleep."

By the 14th century, the Yogatārāvalī (24–26) gives a more detailed description, stating that yoganidra "removes all thought of the world of multiplicity" in the advanced yogi who has completely uprooted his "network of Karma". He then enters the "fourth state", namely turiya or samadhi, beyond the usual states of waking, dreaming, and deep sleep, "that special thoughtless sleep, which consists of [just] consciousness." (Note: References to the fourth state (turiya) and the ordinary states of waking, dreaming and dreamless sleep can be found in the much older Mandukya Upanishad (c. 300 BCE to 300 CE) and later Advaita Vedanta texts (6–7th CE).) The 15th century Haṭha Yoga Pradīpikā goes further, stating (4.49) that "One should practice Khecarī Mudrā until one is asleep in yoga. For one who has achieved Yoganidrā, death never occurs." Khecarī Mudrā is the Hatha yoga practice of folding the tongue back so that it reaches inside the nasal cavity, where it can enable the yogi to reach samadhi. In the 17th century Haṭha Ratnāvalī (3.70), Yoganidrasana is first described. It is an asana or yoga pose where the legs are wrapped around the back of the neck. The text says that the yogi should sleep in this position, which "bestows bliss". These texts view yoganidra as a state, not a practice in itself.

== Modern usage ==
=== Western "relaxationism" ===
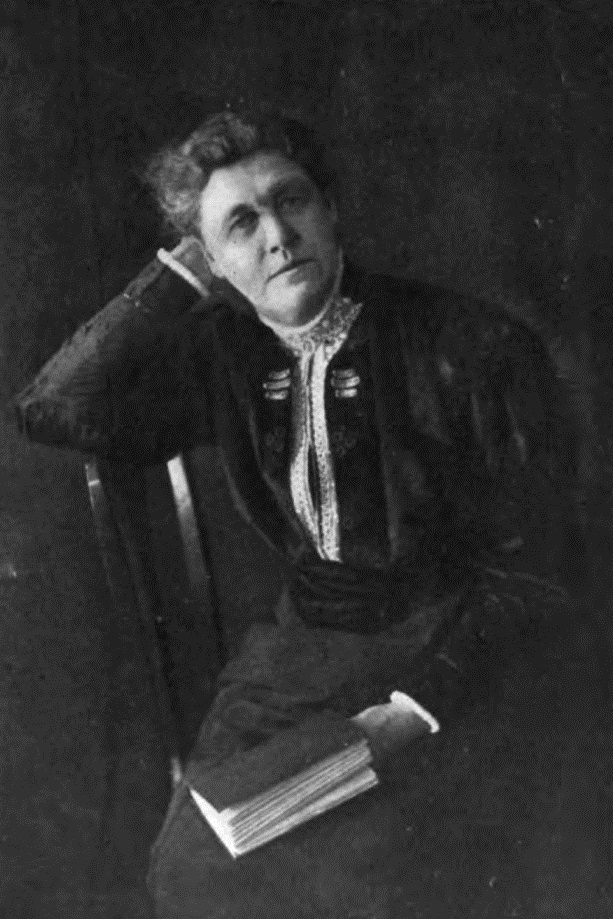
Modern yoga nidra derives from Western "relaxationist" techniques proposed by authors such as Annie Payson Call.

The yoga scholar Mark Singleton states that while relaxation is a primary feature of modern Western yoga, its relaxation techniques "have no precedent in the pre-modern yoga tradition", but derive mostly from 19th and 20th century Western "proprioceptive relaxation". This prescriptive approach was described by authors such as the "relaxationist" Annie Payson Call (Note: For more on Call's influence on yoga, see Yoga and harmonial gymnastics.) in her 1891 book Power through Repose, and the Chicago psychiatrist Edmund Jacobson, the creator of progressive muscle relaxation and biofeedback, in his 1934 book You Must Relax!

Once on the floor, give way to it as far as possible. Every day you will become more sensitive to tension, and every day you will be better able to drop it. While you are flat on your backs, if you can find some one to "prove" your relaxation, so much the better. Let your friend lift an arm, bending it at the different joints, and then carefully lay it down. See if you can give its weight entirely to the other person, so that it seems to be no part of you, but as separate as if it were three bags of sand, fastened loosely at the wrist, the elbow, and the shoulder; it will then be full of life without tension.

— Annie Payson Call, Power through Repose, Chapter 12 "Training for Rest"

=== Dennis Boyes ===
In 1973, French yoga advocate Dennis Boyes published his book Le Yoga du sommeil éveillé; méthode de relaxation, yoga nidra ("The Yoga of Waking Sleep: method of relaxation, yoga nidra"). This is the first known usage of "yoga nidra" in a modern sense. In the book, Boyes makes use of relaxation techniques including the direction of attention to each part of the body:

Dirigez votre attention dans le front de votre visage... Sentez bien le front... Descendez un peu jusqu'à l'œil droit... Guidez votre attention dans l'œil... Eprouvez la forme sphéroïde du globe oculaire... Essayez de bien sentir, doucement... directement, sans utiliser la pensée ou l'image mentale...

Translation:

Direct your attention into your forehead... Feel the forehead well... Go down a little to the right eye... Guide your attention into the eye... Experience the spheroidal shape of the eyeball... Try to feel it well, softly... directly, without using thought or a mental image...

The French journal Revue 3^{e} Millénaire, reviewing Boyes's approach in 1984, wrote that Boyes proposes relaxation in order to "reach the state of emptiness". The person thus imperceptibly moves to a stage where relaxation becomes meditation and can remain there once the mind's obsession with external objects or thoughts is removed.

=== Satyananda ===
In modern times, Satyananda Saraswati claimed to have experienced yoga nidra when he was living with his guru Sivananda Saraswati in Rishikesh. In 1976, he constructed a system of relaxation through guided meditation, (Note: Richard Miller credits Sivananda and several of his disciples—Swamis Satyananda, Satchidananda, and Vishnudevananda as "revitaliz[ing]" yoga nidra in the 20th century; also Boyes, Swami Rama, Swami Veda Bharati, and Brahmananda Sarasvati of Surat Shabd Yoga "among others".) which he popularized in the mid-20th century. He explained yoga nidra as a state of mind between wakefulness and sleep that opened deep phases of the mind, suggesting a connection with the ancient tantric practice called nyasa, whereby Sanskrit mantras are mentally placed within specific body parts while meditating on each part (of the bodymind). The form of practice taught by Satyananda includes eight stages (internalisation, resolve (sankalpa), rotation of consciousness, breath awareness, manifestation of opposites, creative visualization, repeated resolve (sankalpa), and externalisation). Satyananda used this technique, along with the suggestion, on the child who was to become his successor, Niranjanananda Saraswati, from age four. He claimed to have been taught several languages by this method.

Satyananda's multi-stage yoga nidra technique is not found in ancient or medieval texts. However, the yoga scholars Jason Birch and Jacqueline Hargreaves note that there are analogues for several of his yoga nidra activities.

Birch & Hargreaves' analysis of origins of Satyananda's Yoga nidra
Order	Satyananda	Earlier practices	Notes
1.	Preparation	Savasana, lying down, was used in Laya yoga in Dattātreyayogaśāstra.	It was a meditation technique, not a preparatory stage.
2.	Resolve / Sankalpa	Sankalpa was intentional thinking.	Medieval texts like Amanaska sought to rid the mind of Sankalpa, not to use it. Satyananda was probably following Western relaxation therapies.
3.	Rotation of consciousness	Nyāsa is described in Mahānirvānatantra and other tantras.	Sir John Woodroffe's translation (chapter 3, 39–43) says one should say mantras in turn over six parts of the body. Satyananda could have built up his practice starting from this. The 14th century Yogayājñavalkya (7.6–31ab) describes an 18-point body scan for pratyāhāra (withdrawal of the senses, one of the eight limbs of yoga) but there is no evidence Satyananda knew of this.
4.	Awareness of breath	———	The 13th century Vivekamārtaṇḍa names the sounds of inbreath and outbreath, implying awareness of breath.
5.	Feelings and sensations	The 14th century Yogabīja (verse 90) calls yoga "the union of the multitude of opposites".	It is unclear whether Satyananda made use of medieval texts for this activity. The texts speak of transcending opposites, whereas he uses them in meditation.
6.	Creative visualisation	Visualisations were the characteristic feature of tantric yoga, with dhyāna using complex images of a deity.	Satyananda uses other images, such as the cross or golden egg, but his process of concentration, meditation and absorption is like that in yoga texts.
7.	Repeated resolve / Sankalpa, ending	Intentional thinking, as in item (2.)	Satyananda repeats the Resolve stage and then gradually brings the mind back to wakefulness.

Yoga nidra in this modern sense is a state in which the body is completely relaxed, and the practitioner becomes systematically and increasingly aware of the inner world by following a set of verbal instructions. This state of consciousness is different from meditation, in which concentration on a single focus is required. In yoga nidra the practitioner remains in a state of light withdrawal of the 5 senses (pratyahara) with four senses internalised, that is, withdrawn, and only hearing still connects to any instructions given.

=== Swami Rama ===
Swami Rama taught a form of yoga nidra (in a broad sense), which involves an exercise called shavayatra, "inner pilgrimage [through the body]", which directs the attention around "61 sacred points of the body" during relaxation in shavasana, corpse pose. A second exercise, shithali karana, is said to induce "a very deep state of relaxation" and is described as a preliminary for yoga nidra (in a narrow sense). It, too, is performed in shavasana, involving exhalations imagined as directed from the crown of the head to different points around the body, each repeated 5 or 10 times. The yoga nidra exercise involves directed breathing on the left side, then the right side, then in shavasana. In shavasana, the attention is directed to the eyebrow, throat, and heart centers or chakras.

=== Richard Miller ===
The Western pioneer of yoga as therapy, Richard Miller, has developed the use of yoga nidra for rehabilitating soldiers in pain, using the Integrative Restoration (iRest) methodology. Miller worked with Walter Reed Army Medical Center and the United States Department of Defense studying the efficacy of the approach. According to Yoga Journal, "Miller is responsible for bringing the practice to a remarkable variety of nontraditional settings," which includes "military bases and in veterans' clinics, homeless shelters, Montessori schools, Head Start programs, hospitals, hospices, chemical dependency centers, and jails." The iRest protocol was used with soldiers returning from Iraq and Afghanistan suffering from post-traumatic stress disorder (PTSD). The Surgeon General of the United States Army endorsed Yoga Nidra as a complementary alternative medicine (CAM) for chronic pain in 2010.

=== Post-lineage yoga nidra ===
In 2021, the yoga teachers Uma Dinsmore-Tuli and Nirlipta Tuli jointly published a "declaration of independence for Yoga Nidrā Shakti". In it, they stated that yoga nidra had become commodified and promoted by commercial organisations for profit; that abuse had taken place within those organisations; and that the organisations had propagated origin stories for yoga nidra "that privilege their own founders" and exclude or neglect older roots of the practice. They state their shock at abuses by Satyananda, Swami Rama, Amrit Desai, and Richard Miller. They invite practitioners and teachers to learn about the history of yoga nidra outside organisational boundaries and to work without "trademarked versions" of the practice.

== Reception ==
The Mindful Yoga teacher Anne Cushman states that "This body-sensing journey [that I teach in Mindful Yoga] ... is one variation of the ancient practice of Yoga nidra ... and of the body-scan technique commonly used in the Buddhist Vipassana tradition."

The cultural historian Alistair Shearer writes that the name yoga nidra is an umbrella term for different systems of "progressive relaxation or 'guided meditation'." He comments that Satyananda promoted his version of yoga nidra, claiming it was ancient, when its connections to ancient texts "seem vague at best". Shearer writes that other teachers have defined yoga nidra as "the state of conscious sleep" in which inner awareness is maintained, without reference to Satyananda's method of progressive relaxation by directing attention to different parts of the body. Shearer attributes this "inner lucidity" to the buddhi (intellect, literally "wakefulness") of Sankhya philosophy. He compares buddhi to the "intellect" discussed by Saint Augustine and the Apostolic Fathers at about the same time as Patanjali's Yoga Sutra.

== Scientific evidence ==
During a single-observation study of a famous yogi, Swami Rama demonstrated conscious entry into NREM delta wave sleep through yoga nidra, while a disciple produced delta and theta waves even with eyes open and talking. A therapeutic model was developed which appeared to be useful for insomnia patients. A study found a beneficial effect of yoga nidra on the sleep of forty-five male athletes, noting that sportsmen often have sleep problems. Their small randomised controlled trial found improvements in subjective sleep latency and sleep efficiency with four weeks of yoga nidra compared to progressive muscular relaxation (Note: Progressive muscular relaxation is a method to relieve tension by tensing a group of muscles when breathing in, and relaxing it when breathing out; the muscle groups are tensed and relaxed in a prescribed sequence.) (used as the control).

Studies have found benefits to mind and body such as increased dopamine release in the brain, improved heart rate variability, reduced blood pressure, reduced anxiety, and improved self-esteem. There is evidence of neural modulation of the default mode network and functional coupling in experienced yoga nidra meditators. There is some evidence for other beneficial outcomes.

== See also ==
- Dream yoga
- Mindful yoga
