= A History of Modern Yoga =

2004 book by Elizabeth De Michelis

- Subject: Modern yoga
- Genre: Social history, Religion
- Publisher: Continuum
- Publication date: 2004

A History of Modern Yoga is a 2004 book of social and religious history by the scholar of modern yoga Elizabeth De Michelis. It introduced a typology of modern yoga including modern postural yoga.

== Context ==
Yoga became widespread in the Western world in the late 20th century, but received little academic attention until the 21st century, broadly starting with Elizabeth De Michelis's book, based on her doctoral thesis. It encouraged other scholars, including De Michelis's pupil Mark Singleton in his 2010 book Yoga Body, to investigate the origins of the modern, global, yoga phenomenon.

Elizabeth De Michelis is a scholar of religion specialising in the history of modern yoga. In 2006, she was instrumental in creating the Modern Yoga Research website. In 2016 she set up AMRAY (Association Monégasque pour la Recherche Académique sur le Yoga) to support yoga studies research, and helped to organise a conference on yoga at the Jagiellonian University, Krakòw. In 2018 she initiated the Journal of Yoga Studies and serves as its senior editor.

== Book ==
=== Contents ===
The book is in two parts, first a "prehistory" of modern yoga, and then an account of what De Michelis means by modern yoga, distinguishing subtypes "Modern Psychosomatic Yoga" (as in Sivananda Yoga), "Modern Postural Yoga" (as in Iyengar yoga, Ashtanga (vinyasa) yoga, and many other schools) and "Modern Meditational Yoga" (as in Transcendental Meditation).

The book is illustrated with 14 monochrome photographs including three of Keshubchandra Sen, four of Vivekananda and his book, and four from pages of B. K. S. Iyengar's books.

=== Reception ===
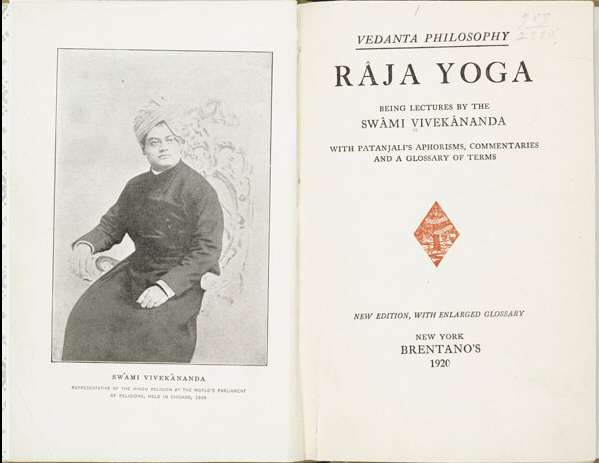
De Michelis argued that modern global yoga has its roots in Vivekananda's 1896 Raja Yoga adaptation of yoga for a Western audience.

Harold Coward, reviewing the book in Journal of Hindu-Christian Studies, notes that De Michelis distinguishes between Patanjali's account of yoga in his classical Yoga Sutras and Vivekananda's personal reinterpretation of yoga for the modern world in his 1896 Raja Yoga.

Elephant Journal notes that the well-researched book sets modern yoga in its cultural context, but that it "then leaps forward" from Vivekananda at the end of the 19th century to Iyengar in the mid-20th.

Suzanne Newcombe, in the Oxford Research Encyclopedia of Religion, notes that the book started the academic focus on contemporary yoga with its definition and analysis of "modern yoga".

Albertina Nugteren, reviewing the book in Aries, notes that it promises to provide a historical overview of the transformation of yoga when it crossed the cultural boundary from India to the West, but that "the story cannot be told in full, and [the] author has to make choices." As a result, the book is more of a "preliminary overview", but it does three useful things: it links modern yoga's birth to Vivekananda's 1896 Raja Yoga; it provides a workable typology of modern yoga; and it presents one example, Iyengar yoga, in detail. In Nugteren's view, modern postural yoga, "so important in the context of contemporary society's stress on fitness and a perfect body", differs in emphasis from traditional yoga "in India and elsewhere" but "is not divorced from" its spiritual and ethical values.

Lola Williamson, reviewing the book in Alternative Spirituality and Religion Review, calls it "a comprehensive overview" that traces modern yoga's foundations in 19th century esoteric systems from East and West and a mix of early 20th century ideas such as New Thought, mesmerism, Neo-Vedanta and Raja Yoga, all the way to the globalisation of yoga.

== See also ==
- Yoga Body, Mark Singleton's 2010 book on the origins of global yoga in physical culture
- Selling Yoga, Andrea Jain's 2015 book on the commercialisation of global yoga

== Sources ==
- De Michelis, Elizabeth (2004). A History of Modern Yoga : Patañjali and Western Esotericism. Continuum. ISBN 978-0-8264-8772-8. OCLC 51942410.
