= Swami Rama =

Indian yoga guru (1925-1996)

Personal life
- Born: Brij Kishore Dhasmana; 1925 Northern India
- Died: 13 November 1996 (aged 70–71)

Religious life
- Religion: Hinduism

Religious career
- Teacher: Bengali Baba

Swami Rama (Svāmī Rāma; 1925 – 13 November 1996) was an Indian yoga guru. He moved to the US in 1969, initially teaching yoga at the YMCA, and founding the Himalayan Institute of Yoga Science and Philosophy in Illinois in 1971; its headquarters moved to its current location in Honesdale, Pennsylvania in 1977. He became famous for his ability to control his body in yoga nidra, writing many books including the autobiographical Living with Himalayan Masters. From the 1970s onwards, there were persistent allegations of sexual abuse of his followers; in 1997 a woman won a lawsuit against him for multiple sexual assaults.

== Early life ==
Swami Rama was born Brij Kiśore Dhasmana or Brij Kiśore Kumar, to a northern Indian Brahmin family in the village of Toli in the Garhwal Himalayas. He claimed that he was raised somewhere in the monasteries and holy caves of the Himalayas by his personal guru or master Sri Madhavananda Bharati. He further claimed to have gained degree-level qualifications from an Indian school of homeopathic medicine, the University of Hamburg, Utrecht University, and finally the University of Oxford. However, in 1987 two of his closest followers left his Himalayan Institute when they learnt that part of his official biography had been "fabricated"; further, Vanessa Webber of the Cult Awareness Network has stated that his academic background could not be verified.

In 1969 he went to the United States, where he gave lectures in temples and churches, and taught Hatha yoga in YMCAs and in private homes. Concerned that the YMCA had presented yoga as one of its physical fitness programs, he included some philosophy and meditation in his classes.

== Himalayan Institute ==
In 1966, he founded the original Himalayan Institute of Yoga Science and Philosophy in Kanpur, India; this was followed by an institute in Glenview, Illinois in 1971; it is now headquartered in Honesdale, Pennsylvania, purchased in 1977. The institute has branches in the United States, Europe, and India. Swami Rama founded other teaching and service organizations, including a large medical facility, in Dehradun in Uttarakhand in the north of India, to serve millions of poor people in the nearby mountains who had little access to health care.

== Yoga nidra ==
Swami Rama's abilities in yoga nidra, a guided meditation whose name means "yogic sleep", were measured experimentally at the Menninger Foundation in Topeka, Kansas in 1971. He was seen to be able to produce different brain waves at will. As he relaxed, he created alpha waves by "imagining an empty blue sky with drifting clouds". He then produced the longer theta waves of dreaming sleep, and finally the slow delta waves of deep sleep, staying aware throughout and able to describe accurately what had happened in the laboratory although he had been lying in the laboratory "snoring".

In another experiment at the Menninger Foundation, he voluntarily stopped his heart from pumping blood for 17 seconds. He did this by increasing his heart rate to 300 beats per minute so that the ventricles stopped pumping and the atria just fluttered. He was further seen to create a temperature differential of 5 degrees Celsius between two areas on the palm of his right hand.

Widely reported in the mainstream media, he acquired a reputation for achieving remarkable psychosomatic states; the New York Times journalist and author William J. Broad described him as "the star of autonomic control". The result was a sharp increase of interest in his teachings. All the same, he was critical of the tendency for yogis to use supernatural feats to demonstrate their enlightenment, arguing that these only demonstrated the ability to perform a feat.

== Writings ==
Swami Rama authored dozens of books, published in India and America, which describe the path he took to become a yogi. He discusses the philosophy, practice and benefits of yoga and meditation. In an early co-authored book, Yoga and Psychotherapy (1976), he presented Hatha Yoga with reference to western psychology. His best known work is Living With Himalayan Masters; the cultural historian Alistair Shearer calls it "an influential autobiography".

== Sexual abuse ==
Swami Rama has been accused and sued for sexual abuse. Abuses alleged to have taken place against former students of Swami Rama in Chicago, in Minneapolis, in New York, and in India in the 1970s were documented by Patricia Ann Darling in a chapter of her 1987 University of Minnesota PhD thesis. The journalist Katharine Webster stated in Yoga Journal in 1990 that women had since the early 1970s made claims of sexual abuse against him, and that since the matter had never been investigated, she had spent two years researching it. She heard "numerous former students say they left the [Himalayan] Institute because they were sexually exploited by Swami Rama or knew someone who was". She wrote that their statements, two of which were on file with the Cult Awareness Network in New York, fitted a pattern of what she called "sex in the forbidden zone", with a guru, "coupled with institutional mechanisms of defense and denial".

In 1997, a woman won a lawsuit, first filed in 1994, regarding multiple sexual assault by Swami Rama while she was attending the Himalayan Institute in 1993; she was awarded $1.9 million in damages. This was one of the first judgements against a yoga guru for sexual activity with a devotee.

== Sources ==
- Broad, William (2012). The Science of Yoga: The Risks and the Rewards. New York: Simon & Schuster. ISBN 978-1-4516-4142-4.
- Shearer, Alistair (2020). The Story of Yoga: From Ancient India to the Modern West. London: Hurst Publishers. ISBN 978-1-78738-192-6.
- Syman, Stefanie (2010). The Subtle Body: The Story of Yoga in America. New York: Farrar, Straus, and Giroux. ISBN 978-0-374-23676-2., available at Archive.org
