= The Story of Yoga =

2020 non-fiction book by Alistair Shearer

- Front cover of the first edition showing a yogi in Akarna Dhanurasana, the shooting bow pose
- Author: Alistair Shearer
- Language: English
- Subject: Yoga as exercise
- Genre: Non-fiction
- Publisher: Hurst Publishers
- Publication date: 2020
- Publication place: England
- Pages: 419 (first edition)
- ISBN: 978-1-78738-192-6

The Story of Yoga: From Ancient India to the Modern West is a cultural history of yoga by Alistair Shearer, published by Hurst in 2020. It narrates how an ancient spiritual practice in India became a global method of exercise, often with no spiritual content, by way of diverse movements including Indian nationalism, the Theosophical Society, Swami Vivekananda's coming to the west, self-publicising western yogis, Indian muscle builders, Krishnamacharya's practice in Mysore, and pioneering teachers like B. K. S. Iyengar.

The book has been received warmly by critics in the western world, who found it erudite, informative and well-written. In India, The Hindu found it a readable account of how an ancient path to enlightenment had become a profitable wellness industry, while the Hindustan Times considered that Shearer had an agenda to argue that western body-yoga was unrelated to Indian spiritual yoga.

== Context ==
Alistair Shearer is a cultural historian of India; he was a lecturer at SOAS. He teaches meditation and has co-founded a retreat hotel in Kerala, South India. (Note: Shearer 2020, cover biography)

== Book ==
=== Content ===
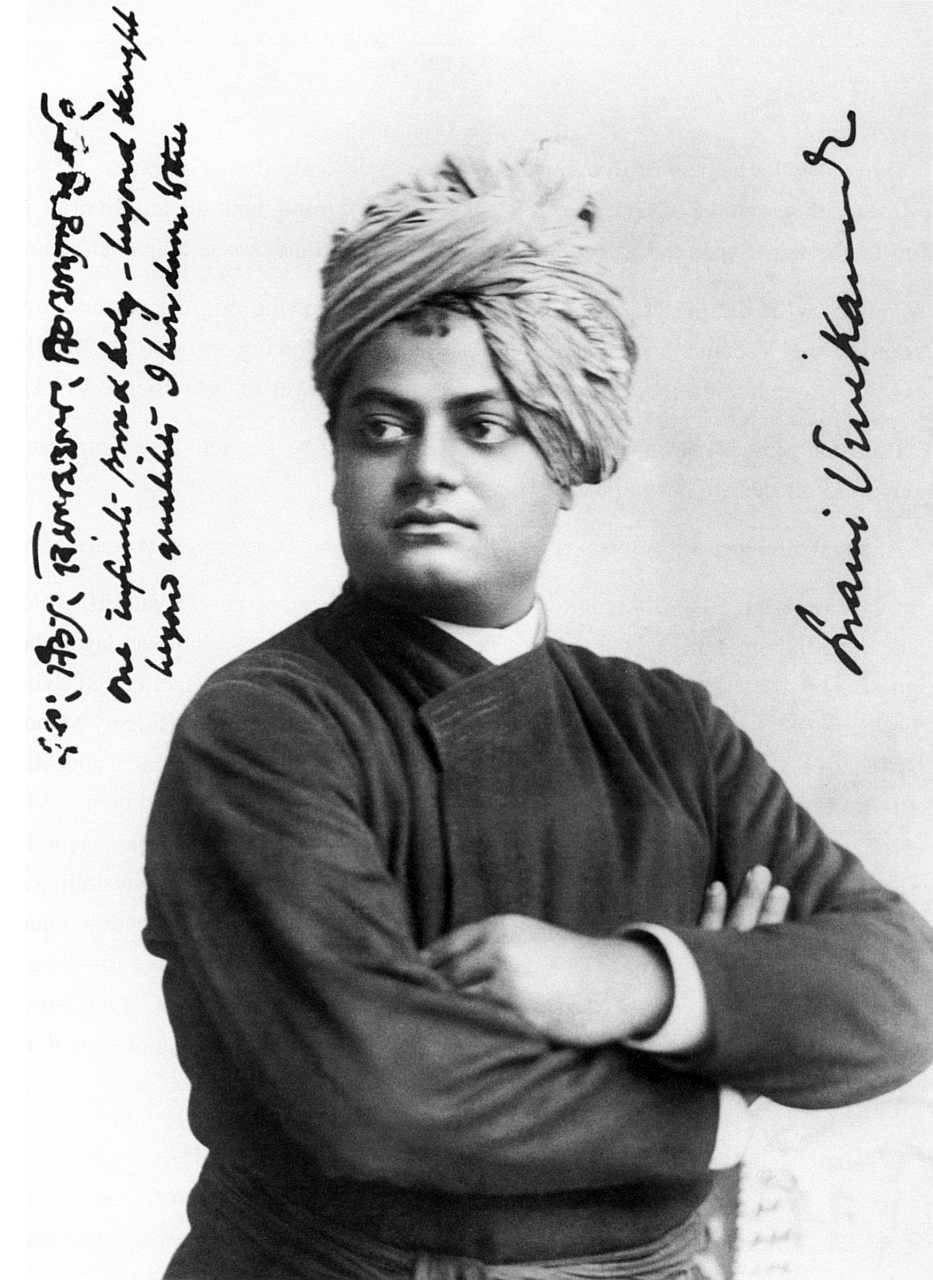
Vivekananda helped to create the modern practice of what Shearer calls "body-yoga" through his visit to Chicago, September 1893 (Note: Shearer 2020, chapter 11)

The book is divided into two parts, with some 350 pages of narrative in 30 chapters.

The first part steps through the history of yoga, from ancient times onwards, in 19 chapters. The older history covers the origins of yoga from around 500 BC, the forest sages, Patanjali's Yoga Sutras, the yoga of the Bhagavad Gita, yoga in Islamic India and under the British Raj, and the impact of Indian nationalism. (Note: Shearer 2020, chapters 1–9) The modern history covers the Theosophical Society, Swami Vivekananda's coming to the west, "roguey yogis" like Pierre Bernard, muscle builders such as K. V. Iyer, yoga at the Mysore Palace with Krishnamacharya, and pioneering teachers who brought yoga to the west, including B. K. S. Iyengar. The story then moves on to yoga for women, and pioneering female practitioners or yoginis such as Indra Devi. The part concludes with an account of pioneers like Yogananda, and Maharishi Mahesh Yogi with his Transcendental Meditation. (Note: Shearer 2020, chapters 10–19)

The 11 chapters of the second part describe yoga "today", including both what Shearer calls "body-yoga" (physical practices, mainly the yoga poses called asanas) and "mind-yoga" (meditational practices). Body-yoga is introduced with an account of Bikram Yoga, the science of yoga, yoga teacher training, the British Wheel of Yoga, Yogendra and Kuvalayananda's attempts to treat yoga as science, and Sivananda Yoga. (Note: Shearer 2020, chapters 20–23) Mind-yoga is covered with discussion of the concepts of Patanjali-style meditation and Mindfulness. (Note: Shearer 2020, chapters 24–25) The book concludes with coverage of the rapid growth in yoga's worldwide popularity, the sex scandals affecting yoga gurus, commercialisation by companies such as Lululemon, and some of the many schools and hybrids of yoga. The book looks at the question of whether body-yoga is spiritual or secular, along with India's political creation of an annual International Day of Yoga. (Note: Shearer 2020, chapters 26–30)

=== Illustrations ===
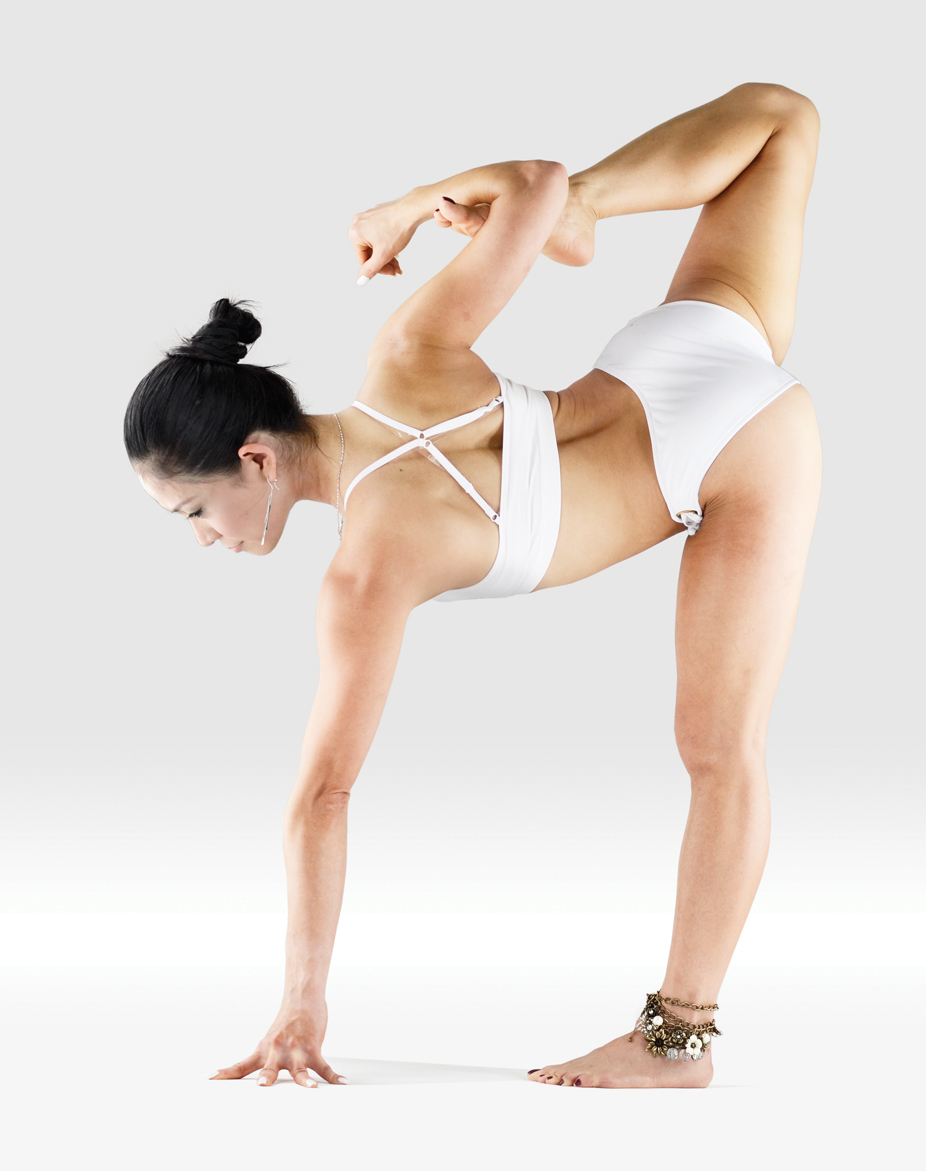
"A modern yogini", according to the book. (Note: Shearer 2020, plate 24) "Mermaid pose" demonstrated by a follower of Mr. Yoga, 2016

The Story of Yoga is illustrated with 27 colour plates, in a group after page 236. They depict temple sculptures of yogis; early book illustrations, both western and from India; portraits of yoga gurus; and photographs of various practices, historic figures, and celebrities. The final photograph depicts the Indian prime minister Narendra Modi, sitting cross-legged in the street in New Delhi, leading thousands of people in a yoga practice on the first International Yoga Day in 2015. (Note: Shearer 2020, pp. xi–xiii)

=== Publication history ===
The book was published in hardback in 2020 by Hurst Publishers of London.

== Reception ==
The Story of Yoga has been warmly received by reviewers in the western world. The Financial Times writes that the book explains how modern western forms of yoga "have overlooked its complex history". Shearer tells how yoga has both physical and mental effects, including injuries especially in those forms characterised by relentless drive. At its best, it can bring self-knowledge and calm, but the book denies that yoga offers any magical short cut to such a state. Mihir Bose, writing in the Irish Times, adds that in India, yoga has in his lifetime gone from being a fringe activity to a widespread form of exercise.

Writing in The Daily Telegraph, Mich Brown called the book an "erudite, scholarly and engrossing study". It notes that Shearer explains that yoga is not a religion, but may slowly align the yogi with the principles underlying all religions, and that the Katha Upanishad calls yoga "this complete stillness in which one enters the unitive state", something that the review says may be a surprise to practitioners of modern Ashtanga yoga and other hot styles. It quotes Patanjali as saying that "The physical postures should be steady and comfortable" when all effort is relaxed, commenting "but nobody said it would be easy".

Nicolar Barker, in The Spectator, recalled the recent history of academic research into modern postural yoga, with Norman Sjoman's 1996 The Yoga Tradition of the Mysore Palace and Mark Singleton's "controversial" 2010 Yoga Body: The Origins of Modern Postural Practice, noting that while the research was greeted by Yoga International as "a watershed moment", this was probably spoken "through somewhat gritted teeth". The review calls Shearer's book "clear-eyed, elegantly written and wonderfully informative", writing that his basic thesis is that "mind yoga" and "body yoga" are sharply distinct, and that he critiques western culture's narcissism, addiction to material wealth, and decreasing attention span.

Writing in The Sunday Times, Rosamund Unwin noted that three million people practice yoga in Britain, and that a multi-billion dollar industry has grown from ancient roots in India. In her view, Shearer has made clear that modern yoga is "a long way from yoga's beginnings." However, she found the book full of jargon, lacking in humanity, and only suitable for those who already practise yoga and want to know more about its cultural context.

Tunku Varadarajan wrote in The Wall Street Journal that his wife "follows a routine advertised as yoga, performed by a woman with malleable limbs", that to his Indian eyes "look[s] nothing like the practice whose name they invoke". The journal called the book "a quick-witted and erudite chronicle of the Hindu practice that is now a lucrative staple of 'wellness' in the West." It described the book as distinguishing "Raja Yoga, or yoga of the mind, and Hatha Yoga, or the yoga of force. The former, embedded in meditation, with little or no calisthenic component, is what Patanjali had in mind when he defined yoga as 'the settling of the thought-waves in the mind'. By contrast, most yoga practiced in the West – as well as in India, it should be said – is a version (however outlandish) of Hatha Yoga."

Michael Neale reviewed the book for Asian Affairs journal, calling it "a fascinating survey [and] not only for practitioners of the world's burgeoning Wellness industry".

The Oldie wrote that the book's "exhaustive examination of the history and purpose of yoga" had been widely reviewed, something it found unsurprising as yoga had been treated as the answer to all the spiritual and physical ailments of the western world. It commented that yoga traditionally took "a lifetime to master" and "was never intended to be squeezed into a stress-relieving lunch-hour break".

Historical figure A historical figure is a significant person in history. The significance of such figures in human progress has been debated. Some think they play a crucial role, while others say they have little impact on the broad currents of thought and social change".

The Hindu found the book readable, answering the question of how the ancient path to enlightenment turned into "a $25 billion-a-year wellness industry". In its view the opening history chapters had "a scholarly density", though after that it was a lighter read, Shearer arguing that the practice had always been an inward-looking "mind-yoga", and that the west has turned it into a fitness- or health-oriented "body-yoga". The paper reports that Shearer told it that he took three years to write the book, cutting some 40,000 words of detailed history (such as of the Bihar School of Yoga) from the draft.

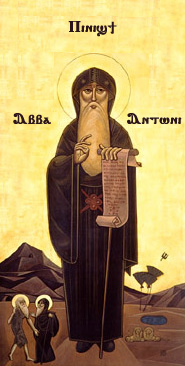
Shearer found affinities between yoga and the ascetic Desert Fathers (here, Anthony the Great).

The Hindustan Times stated that Shearer had an "agenda" to argue "that body-yoga as it is practised in the west does not have any basis in Indian yoga, which was more spiritual and mystical." The reviewer however found the book "rich in anecdotal data" and found his sensitive account of the teacher-pupil relationship and the current scandals about abuse "nuanced".

== Interview ==
The Baptist theologian Albert Mohler interviewed Shearer about the book. Asked why he had written it, Shearer replied that he had learnt Transcendental Meditation at university, and was interested in India, having had relatives there. He then learnt Sanskrit to study the texts. He agreed the book was controversial. Asked whether suburban yoga is "the same thing" practised by yogis in ancient India, he said it was a good question, and the one the book tried to answer, but it depended on why people were practising yoga. Using it as exercise was fine, but it was not "the full meal"; treating body yoga as the whole system was "selling yoga short". Shearer agreed with Mohler that yoga had always been understood to be "a unity", and found the Christian perspective interesting and deep; the book's final chapter addressed the question of religion, and whether it could fit with yoga. He thought there were "many affinities" between Christian traditions such as of the Desert Fathers and yoga, and noted that Catholic priests were expected to be celibate. He supposed that many Christians who found Hinduism unacceptable would find yoga a practical way "to access their own inner depths". He agreed with Mohler that the transition from ancient Indian practice to the consumerist, individualist, and celebrity-filled western varieties was full of contradictions, and that it was "certainly misappropriation".

== Sources ==
- Shearer, Alistair (2020). The Story of Yoga: From Ancient India to the Modern West. London: Hurst Publishers. ISBN 978-1-78738-192-6.
