= Elizabeth De Michelis =

Elizabeth De Michelis is a scholar of religion specialising in the history of modern yoga. She is known especially for her 2004 book A History of Modern Yoga, which triggered academic research into modern yoga. She is the founder and senior editor of the Journal of Yoga Studies.

== Life ==
Elizabeth De Michelis earned her bachelor's degree in Modern Languages and trained as a translator. She worked in industry before returning to academic life. She then took a master's degree in Religious Studies from SOAS University of London, followed by a PhD on the history of modern yoga, including its transformation from a strand of Hinduism to a Western cultural practice, at the University of Cambridge. She joined the faculty of divinity there, and then the faculty of theology at the University of Oxford. In 2000 she became director of the Dharam Hinduja Institute of Indic Research in Cambridge.

Her 2004 book A History of Modern Yoga, based on her doctoral thesis, broadly started academic research into modern yoga (including yoga as exercise). It encouraged other scholars, including De Michelis's pupil Mark Singleton in his 2010 book Yoga Body, to investigate the origins of the modern, global, yoga phenomenon.

In 2006, De Michelis was instrumental in creating the Modern Yoga Research website. In 2016 she set up AMRAY (Association Monégasque pour la Recherche Académique sur le Yoga) to support yoga studies research, and helped to organise a conference on yoga at the Jagiellonian University, Krakòw. In 2018 she initiated the Journal of Yoga Studies and serves as its senior editor.

== Books ==
- De Michelis, Elizabeth (2004). A History of Modern Yoga : Patañjali and Western Esotericism. Continuum. ISBN 978-0-8264-8772-8. OCLC 51942410.
- De Michelis, Elizabeth (2008). Yoga in the Modern World. Routledge. doi:10.4324/9780203894996-9. ISBN 978-0203894996.

== Reception ==
A History of Modern Yoga was well received by scholars, who noted that it set out the outlines of the transformation of yoga as it moved from India to the Western world, without being able to tell the whole story, and in particular glossing over the gap between Vivekananda's spiritual Raja Yoga in 1896 and B.K.S. Iyengar's physical yoga of the mid-20th century. Suzanne Newcombe writes that the book started the academic focus on contemporary yoga with its definition and analysis of 'modern yoga'.
