= Genevieve Stebbins =

American author and teacher of gymnastics (1857–1934)

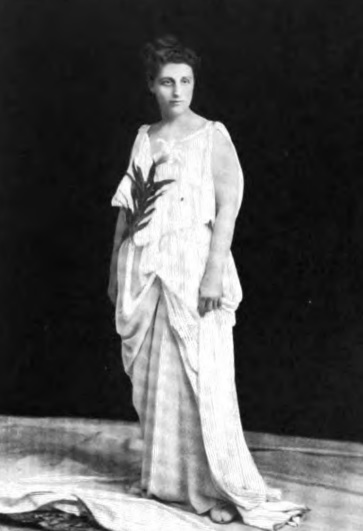
- In 1902
- Born: March 7, 1857; San Francisco, California, U.S.
- Died: September 21, 1934 (aged 77); Monterey, California, U.S.
- Education: Boston University School of Oratory
- Occupations: author, teacher, performer
- Spouses: Joseph A. Thompson (m. 1888; div. 1892) Norman Astley (m. 1892)
- Writing career
- Language: English
- Subject: Delsarte System
- Notable works: Delsarte System of Expression, Society Gymnastics and Voice Culture, Dynamic Breathing and Harmonic Gymnastics, Genevieve Stebbins' System of Physical Training

Genevieve Stebbins (March 7, 1857 – September 21, 1934) was an American author, teacher of her system of Harmonic Gymnastics and performer of the Delsarte system of expression. She published four books and was the founder of the New York School of Expression.

== Early years ==
Genevieve Stebbins was born on March 7, 1857, in San Francisco, California, to James Cole Stebbins and Henrietta Smith. Her mother died when she was two years old. As a young child she always loved to dance and perform.

== Career ==
=== Theatre ===
Stebbins first came to New York City from San Francisco to study for the stage, under a leading actress of Albert Marshman Palmer's Union Square Theatre. After a Winter's course of instruction, she made her debut on the stage as leading juvenile of Palmer's Company, in Rose Michel. The following year, she accepted an engagement under Dion Boucicault, and later, was playing the leading part in Our Boys at Daly's Theatre, when she met Steele MacKaye, the disciple and successor of François Delsarte, who persuaded her to retire from the stage and study the Delsarte System with him for two years, promising her the leading part in a play which he was writing at the time. Stebbins spent six months of this two years at the Boston University School of Oratory (later known as Boston School of Oratory), as MacKaye's representative, giving the system of Delsarte to pupils and teachers in exchange for private and class lessons in elocution from Prof. Lewis Baxter Monroe, Dean of that school. Nearly every well-known graduate of that school was under her instruction, and to her many of them were indebted for their entire knowledge of the Delsarte System.

In May, 1879, Stebbins made her re-entrance on the stage as the leading lady of the Madison Square Theatre. The papers were unanimous in her praise. The following year, she accepted an engagement with Helena Modjeska's manager to play leading Shakespearian roles. In 1881, she went to Paris to study with François-Joseph Regnier, President of the Conservatoire and Societaire of the Theatre Francois. On her return to the United States in 1882, Stebbins read in public and accepted other theatrical engagements.

=== Harmonic Gymnastics ===
In 1885, Stebbins published her first book, The Delsarte System of Expression. Its immediate success decided her to become a lecturer and teacher. She became a special instructor in twenty-one New York schools, and recited and lectured in the principal cities and colleges of the United States. Feeling the need of a gymnastic system for girls that should have the charm of the dance and the physical value of the gymnasium, she elaborated a few Delsarte ideas combined with Ling aesthetic gymnastics and creative work of her own into a complete system of Harmonic Gymnastics. To perfect these gymnastic ideas, she made two more trips abroad, and studied in the U.S. with Dr. George H. Taylor, author of a valuable system of medical gymnastics. Stebbins' studied in physical culture included training in Swedish educational gymnastics, and aesthetic dance going to Harvard Summer School in 1892 for that purpose. During her entire career she was interested in singing, and was the pupil of prominent masters, whose method she applied to training the speaking voice.

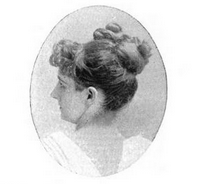
Genevieve Stebbins Astley (1894)

In 1893, she founded the New York School of Expression in the Carnegie Music Hall, Mr. Norman Astley (Stebbins' husband, formerly a British Army captain) being the Business Manager. Her 1893 school brochure listed prior pupils including Felix Adler, of the Ethical Society; Dr. and Mrs. S. S. Curry, of the Boston School of Expression; Dr. C. W. Emerson, founder of the Emerson College of Oratory; Mary Currier, Professor of Elocution at Wellesley; Dr. Canfield, President of Columbus University, Ohio; Professor Hayes, of Harvard; Frank Stuart Parker, Georgie Cayvan, Mrs. James Brown Potter, Mrs. Pierpont Morgan, Mrs. Benjamin Church, Mrs. Vincenzo Botta, Mrs. Post, Miss Vanderbilt, Mrs. John D. Rockefeller, Mrs. Alexander, Mrs. Richard McCurdy, and others; while classes were formed by the Seidl Society, the Musical Artists' Society, the Kindergarten Society, the Ethical Society and other clubs. Steele MacKaye wrote to her when she first launched forth as a teacher: "You are the only one of my pupils whom I can conscientiously recommend to teach what I teach myself"; while Regnier wrote: "You have the true artistic temperament, and I confidently prophesy for you the greatest success.£ Later F. Townsend Southwick (former teacher of oratory at the Academy of Dramatic Arts) joined forces with Stebbins in her school as the principal. She retired from the school in 1907.

Stebbins embodied her method in several books including, Delsarte System of Expression, Society Gymnastics and Voice Culture, Dynamic Breathing and Harmonic Gymnastics, Genevieve Stebbins' System of Physical Training. She completed a new edition of her first work, The Delsarte System of Expression (New York: E. S. Werner Publishing Company), with a second part consisting of lectures and added instruction, illustrated by thirty-two pictures of statues.

== Influence ==
Stebbins's work created more opportunities for late nineteenth-century American women to engage in physical culture and expression, especially in the realm of dance. She provided the means, rationale, and model for what could be accepted as the appropriate practices for middle-class women. Her work in the Delsarte system facilitated the new "modern dance" which would develop in the United States and Europe in the twentieth century. It may also have contributed to the 20th century development of yoga as exercise.

== Personal life ==
Stebbins was married to Joseph A. Thompson from 1888 until she divorced him in 1892. Stebbins was remarried to Norman Astley, a journalist, in April 1892. There is no record of Stebbins having children from either marriage.

Genevieve Stebbins Astley died on September 21, 1934, in Monterey, California.

== Selected works ==
- Drills: Appendix to Society
- Delsarte System of Dramatic Expression, 1886
- Society gymnastics and voice-culture Adapted from the Delsarte System. 6th ed., 1888
- The New York School of Expression, 1893
- Dynamic Breathing and Harmonic Gymnastics: A Complete System of Psychical, Aesthetic and Physical Culture, 1893
- The eve of marriage; monologue for a lady, 1895
- Appendix to Society gymnastics, containing 1. Eastern temple drill, 2. Energizing dramatic drill, 3. Minuet fan drill, 4. An æsthetic drill., 1895
- Genevieve Stebbins's drills, 1895
- Delsartian aesthetic drills, 1913
- The Genevieve Stebbins System of Physical Training, 1913
- The Quest of the Spirit. By a Pilgrim of the Way. Edited and arranged by G. Stebbins., 1913

== Bibliography ==
- Nancy Lee Chalfa Ruyter (1999) The Cultivation of Body and Mind in Nineteenth-Century American Delsartism.
- Kelly Jean Lynch (2022): Aesthetic dance as woman's culture in America at the turn of the twentieth century: Genevieve Stebbins and the New York school of expression, Feminist Modernist Studies, DOI: 10.1080/24692921.2022.2144176
- Kelly Jean Mullan. (2020). Forgotten "New" Dancer of New York City's Gilded Age: Genevieve Lee Stebbins and the Dance as Yet Undreamed. Dance Research Journal, 52(3), 97–117. doi:10.1017/S0149767720000327
- Kelly Jean Mullan. "Somatics herstories: Tracing Elsa Gindler's educational antecedents Hade Kallmeyer and Genevieve Stebbins". Journal of Dance & Somatic Practices, Volume 9, Number 2, 1 September 2017, pp. 159–178(20) https://doi.org/10.1386/jdsp.9.2.159_1
- Kelly Mullan (2016) "Harmonic Gymnastics and Somatics: A Genealogy of Ideas". Currents: Journal of Body-Mind Centering. https://www.academia.edu/32938188/Harmonic_Gymnastics_and_Somatics
- P. Edwards (1999). "Unstoried: Teaching Literature in the Age of Performance Studies". Theatre Annual, 52, 1–147.
