= Himalayan Institute of Yoga Science and Philosophy =

Yoga teaching organisation

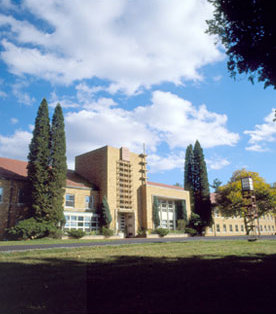
Main building of the Himalayan Institute's headquarters, Pennsylvania

The Himalayan Institute of Yoga Science and Philosophy (HIYSP) is an international non-profit organization, which promotes yoga and holistic health through yoga retreats, residential programs, health products and services, media publications including Yoga International magazine, and humanitarian projects. The institute's main campus is located on (1.6 km^{2}) in the Pocono Mountains of northeastern Pennsylvania and is the site of most of its residential programming. Branch centers also operate in Cameroon, India, and Mexico. It formerly had centres in Great Britain and Malaysia.

== Programs ==
The organization was founded in 1971 by the Indian yoga guru Swami Rama. A range of educational programming for yoga teachers is offered by the Himalayan Institute including training workshops, online courses, seminars, and certifications. The institute publishes additional media through the Himalayan Institute Press, including the magazine Yoga International, and sells health products such as the Varcho Veda line of herbal extracts, and the Neti Pot.

== Philanthropy ==
The Himalayan Institute runs humanitarian projects in different areas of the world. In Kumbo, Cameroon, the institute has implemented vocational training courses in agriculture, holistic medicine, and carpentry. In Jonotla, Mexico, a Himalayan Institute branch center holds sustainable agriculture workshops. The institute has also supported Tibetan refugees in India, with projects in the Bylakuppe and Rabgayling settlements, and has hosted Samdhong Rinpoche, prime minister of the Tibetan government in exile.

The Himalayan Institute has been responsible for several notable sustainability and alternative energy initiatives, including the cultivation of biofuel crops in India, Cameroon and Mexico. In 2010, the organization received a government grant to install a solar thermal system at its headquarters.
