= Annie Payson Call =

American writer

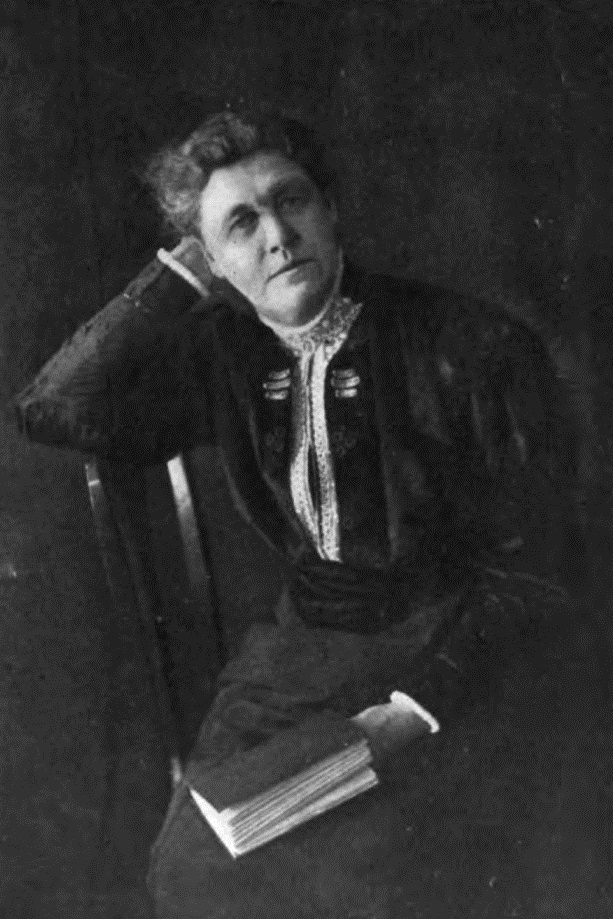
Annie Payson Call, c. 1900

Annie Payson Call (1853–1940) was an American author of advice literature on nervous health and mind–body composure. Based in Waltham, Massachusetts, she wrote for Ladies' Home Journal and published widely read books from the 1890s to the 1910s.

== Biography and work ==
Call grew up in New England in an intellectual environment shaped by liberal Protestant and Swedenborgian currents. Religious-studies scholar Catherine L. Albanese places her among late-nineteenth-century American “harmonial” writers influenced, directly or indirectly, by Emanuel Swedenborg’s doctrine of correspondence between spirit, mind, and body. This metaphysical background framed her concern with nervous health and repose as part of moral and spiritual discipline rather than medical treatment.

Her early works—Regeneration of the Body (1888) and Power Through Repose (1891)—offer practical counsel on muscular and mental relaxation, conscious breathing, and the quieting of will, addressed to readers struggling with overstrain and anxiety. According to historian of yoga Mark Singleton, Call’s writings exemplify a form of “proprioceptive therapy” that sought harmony between body and mind through awareness and suggestion, anticipating later twentieth-century methods of guided relaxation and “meditative movement.” Singleton argues that this popular pedagogy of relaxation anticipated or paralleled later twentieth-century techniques such as guided imagery and progressive relaxation which was presented as “yogic relaxation”.

Scholars also situate Call’s program within the broader late-nineteenth-century culture of suggestion and “nervous” therapeutics. There is no evidence that she trained in a medical school of hypnosis; rather, her emphasis on muscular release, attentive quiet, and the gentle use of suggestion for habit-reeducation reflects the popular diffusion of ideas debated in the Paris and Nancy schools and in Anglo-American hypnotic literature of the period. In addition, historians have located her pedagogy at the intersection of the late-nineteenth-century François Delsarte movement and contemporary suggestion/hypnosis debates. J. M. Andrick analyses the Lasell Seminary dispute over Call’s “nerve-training” classes as a case of “Delsartean hypnosis”—a historiographical label for the blend of Delsartean posture/relaxation work with mild suggestion and guided imagery in women’s education, not a term used by Call herself. Andrick further argues that the Lasell episode illuminates how such pedagogies fed into early twentieth-century relaxation training programs.

Call presented her techniques as means to self-control and everyday composure. Her tone is non-technical and moral-didactic, oriented to middle-class readers concerned with “nerves” and overstrain.

== Works ==
Source: New General Catalog of Old Books and Authors

- Regeneration of the Body (1888)
- Power Through Repose (1891)
- As a Matter of Course (1894)
- The Freedom of Life (1905)
- Man of the World (1905)
- Every Day Living (1906)
- Nerves and Common Sense (1909)
- Brain Power for Business Men (1911)
- How to Live Quietly (1914)
- Nerves and the War (1918)

== Legacy ==
Singleton identifies Call as an early and influential popularizer of guided relaxation in the North Atlantic world, noting conceptual affinities with later mind–body education and with some twentieth-century Western reinterpretations of yogic rest practices; he does not present Call as a source in Indian premodern yoga but as part of a modern Western genealogy of relaxation pedagogy that subsequently was presented as yogic. Albanese reads Call as representative of what she calls American harmonial religion’s emphasis on composure and practical spirituality rather than as a clinical authority.

== Texts online ==
- As A Matter Of Course at Project Gutenberg
- Power Through Repose at Project Gutenberg
- The Freedom Of Life at Project Gutenberg
- Nerves And Common Sense at Project Gutenberg

== See also ==
- Yoga nidra – modern guided-relaxation protocols that some scholars compare to Western relaxation pedagogies taught by Call and her philosophical environment.
