= Copyright claims on Bikram Yoga =

Conflict over the copyrightability of yoga positions

Bikram Choudhury made a series of claims that his yoga practice, Bikram Yoga, was under copyright and that it could not be taught or presented by anyone whom he had not authorized, starting in 2002. In 2011 Choudhury started a lawsuit against Yoga to the People, a competing yoga studio founded by a former student of Bikram's and with a location near one of the Bikram Yoga studios in New York. As a result of that lawsuit, the United States Copyright Office issued a clarification that yoga postures (asanas) could not be copyrighted in the way claimed by Bikram, and that Yoga to the People and others could continue to freely teach these exercises. In 2015, the Ninth Circuit Court of Appeals affirmed a lower court ruling that the Bikram Yoga Sequence was not copyrightable subject matter.

== Background ==
Bikram Choudhury goes by his first name, "Bikram". He is most known in popular culture for mass marketing his yoga practice into a franchising system of 900 yoga studios as of 2004. He insists that classes be taught in these studios in a certain way, and that they taught a series of 26 yoga postures. Starting in 2002, he began having his lawyers send out cease and desist letters to any yoga studio which presented his Bikram Yoga sequences without his authorization.

In the United States, Choudhury has claimed, and been aggressive in threatening suit over, broad copyrights in most aspects of the practice, teaching, and business of the system. He extracted settlements from a number of yoga teachers and studios. However, in 2012, the US Copyright Office concluded that copyright for Bikram's sequence of 26 postures had been issued in error. This led a federal district court, and later the Ninth Circuit Court of Appeals, to reject Choudhury's claims and rule that the sequence of postures was not copyrightable.

== Bikram Yoga versus Yoga to the People ==
Yoga to the People was a yoga studio established by one of Bikram Choudhury's former work associates. It aimed to make yoga available to all, regardless of ability to pay. After Yoga to the People opened a yoga studio near a Bikram Yoga studio, Bikram started a lawsuit to have them cease presenting Bikram Yoga sequences at their studio.

As a result of that lawsuit, the United States Copyright Office issued a clarification that yoga postures (asanas) could not be copyrighted in the way claimed by Bikram, and that Yoga to the People and others could continue to freely teach these exercises. After that clarification Yoga to the People and Bikram came to an agreement that Yoga to the People would not present Bikram Yoga.

Despite not having a court-ordered obligation to do so, Yoga to the People ceased to present Bikram Yoga sequences in its studios and instead began using its own sequences. Of the settlement, Bikram said ""I win, he lose, and that's it... Nobody will ever be able to steal Bikram yoga anymore."

== Bikram's Yoga College v. Evolation Yoga ==
Evolation Yoga was founded by a previous associate of Bikram Choudhury. Choudhury similarly sued Evolation Yoga for teaching hot yoga with the same sequence of postures as Bikram Yoga.

On December 17, 2012, U.S. District Court Judge Otis Wright ruled that Bikram Choudhury does not have copyright protection for the sequence of 26 yoga postures and two breathing exercises commonly known as “Bikram Yoga.” The ruling, in favor of Evolation Yoga LLC and its founders Mark Drost and Zefea Samson, meant that non-Bikram studios are allowed to offer hot yoga classes utilizing that same 26-posture sequence—a legal right Choudhury actively and vigorously contested for several years.

On October 8, 2015, the Ninth Circuit Court of Appeals affirmed, finding that the sequence of yoga postures was not copyrightable subject matter under 17 U.S.C. § 102(b) and that Choudhury's copyright in a book describing his system did not give him copyright over the sequence itself.
