= Yogasana =

Yogasana may mean:

- One of eightyfour Asana, (a posture in hatha yoga or modern postural yoga) that is thought to takes you on to a higher dimension or higher perception of life
- in medieval usage as in the Gheranda Samhita, a cross-legged seated posture like Sukhasana
- Yogasana (sport), postural yoga as competitive sport
