= Competitive yoga =

Competitive sport

Competitive yoga is the performance of asanas in sporting competitions. The activity is controversial as some practitioners believe that it conflicts with the nature of yoga.

== History ==
The International Federation of Sports Yoga has organised annual championships since 1989, and is led by Fernando Estevez-Griego (Swami Maitreyananda). These competitions are not restricted to asanas, but cover all eight limbs of yoga identified in the Yoga Sutras of Patanjali. The 1989 competition was held in Montevideo with the asana competition in Pondicherry.

Competitive yoga has been practised by adults in America since 2003 under the auspices of Rajashree Choudhury, who founded the International Yoga Sport Federation (IYSF) in 2003, and since 2009 under the auspices of the nonprofit organisation United States Yoga Federation (USA Yoga), also founded by Rajashree Choudhury; competitions were later introduced for children from the age of 7. The fiercely contested international Bishnu Charan Ghosh Cup was initially held annually in Los Angeles. Bishnu Charan Ghosh inspired the yoga style of Bikram Choudhury, the founder of Bikram Yoga, and Choudhury has been closely associated with America's competitive yoga from its inception. His ex-wife Rajashree Choudhury, also a student of the Ghosh lineage and an all-India asana champion, created USA Yoga, described in 2022 as the leading competitive yoga organisation.

The documentary film Posture by Nathan Bender and Daniel Nelson portrays competitors and detractors of the USA Yoga Federation National Championship.

== Sport or spiritual ==
The idea of competitive yoga seems an oxymoron to some people in the yoga community. The author Rajiv Malhotra described competitive yoga as "a form of misappropriation". The yoga teacher Loretta Turner called the term "offensive, because yoga is much more than posturing". The journalist Neal Pollack said that the goal of all types of yoga is samadhi, "enlightened bliss where the ego separates from the self and the practitioner realizes that he's powerless to control the vagaries of an endlessly shifting universe". Instead, Pollack continued, yoga competitions consist of the performance of asanas derived from hatha yoga. He concluded that he was not sure what he had witnessed, but he was glad to return to his usual modest yoga, free of competitiveness.

The anthropologist and scholar of modern yoga Joseph Alter commented that competitive yoga "anticipates branding and self-promotion." He noted that in the early history of yoga as exercise in the first part of the 20th century, the rival Indian pioneers Kuvalayananda and Yogendra both saw the practice as a way of uniting "body and mind in the service of independent India." Competitive yoga could, as both pioneers saw, be incorporated into the existing structure of athletics in Indian schools, simultaneously encouraging children's personal growth and building physical fitness.

Yoga practitioners and their instructors commonly work to avoid any feeling of competitiveness. The yoga instructor Tanya Boulton comments that yoga is challenging because it teaches people not to be competitive but to be at peace with themselves. Practitioners are advised not to compare themselves to other people in their class, and to accept that yoga is an inner thing, not a matter of physical perfection.
