= Prime Minister's Yoga Awards =

PM Yoga Awards
- Awarded for: Promotion and Development of Yoga
- Country: India
- Presented by: Prime Minister of India
- Rewards: Trophy, Certificate and ₹25 lakhs
- First award: 2017
- Final award: 2019

PM Yoga Awards, officially named as PM's Awards for Outstanding Contribution for Promotion and Development of Yoga are the annual awards by Prime Minister of India for recognizing contribution in promotion and development of Yoga.

== Announcement ==
The institution of the award was announced by the Prime Minister Narendra Modi on the occasion of the Second International Day of Yoga at Chandigarh on 21 June 2016.

== The Award ==
Award includes Trophy, Certificate and Cash Prize of ₹2.5 Million each. It has four categories:

- Individual (National)
- Individual (International)
- Organisation (National)
- Organisation (International)

== List of Award Winners ==
Year	Individual (National)	Individual (International)	Organisation (National)	Organisation (International)	Ref
2017			Ramamani Iyengar Memorial Yoga Institute, Pune		
2018	Vishwas Vasant Mandlik		The Yoga Institute, Mumbai		
2019	Swami Rajarshi Muni (Life Mission, Gujarat)	Antonietta Rozzi (Italy)	Bihar School of Yoga, Munger (Bihar)	Japan Yoga Niketan (Japan)	

== Selection Process ==
The guidelines for awards were developed by AYUSH Ministry and Nominations for awards are invited through open advertisement. Two committees are constituted to evaluate the nominations - Screening Committee (for preliminary evaluation) and Evaluation Committee (Jury).

== See also ==
- CorePower Yoga
