= Hot cycling =

Using a stationary bike in a heated room

Hot cycling refers to a spin class performed in a room heated to 80–84 °F (27–29 °C). Like hot yoga, which uses heat to increase an individual's flexibility in the poses. Heated exercise at temperatures of 100 °F (38 °C) has also been shown to strengthen the immune system and increase the volume of oxygenated blood which can lower cholesterol. Hot cycling can also be performed in an infrared sauna reaching temperatures ranging from 120 to 130 degrees. The purported benefits of hot cycling can include burning massive calories in a shorter amount of time and it can also help rejuvenate your skin and tone your muscles, while also relieving stress from being in the infrared heat. Boston magazine also spoke on hot cycling and said “increased fat burn, a higher metabolic rate, looser muscles, and removing toxins and impurities from the body”.
