= Bodybuilding in India =

- Country: India
- Governing body: Indian Body Builders Federation (IBBF)
- National team: India

Bodybuilding in India is organized and the national federation is internationally recognised. Bodybuilders from the country have competed in international events.

== History ==
In 2013, the Kazakhstani Bodybuilding and Fitness Federation hosted the Asian Championship in Almaty at the Baluan Sholak Sport Palace. At least one Indian participated in the competition. Mumbai hosted the 2014 WBPF World Championship.

== Culture ==
In India, bodybuilders appear on a number of billboards advertising supplements near the offices of the National Institute of Sports.
The overall fitness industry in India has seen a boom over the past two decades. From personal training to sports nutrition, there has been a tremendous increase in general awareness about fitness related topics.

== International exposure ==
The international apex body for strength sports, World Strongmen Federation (WSF), has officially recognised Indian participation into the WSF World Cup 2016. The related launch of India's first television strength reality show, 'Strongest Indian', was announced in April, 2015. The winner of the show will represent India at the next World Strongman Federation World Cup competition. The format of the show is conceptualised by Kaizzad Capadia, co-founder and director of K11 Fitness Academy, and celebrity fitness expert. Kaizzad will personally train the winner for the international competition along with mentors who are ex-Strongman winners.

== Governance ==
The country has a national organization, the Indian Body Building and Fitness Federation (IBFF), that is recognized by the International Federation of Bodybuilding and Fitness as a national federation, representing the country's bodybuilding community. The national federation is a member of the Asian Bodybuilding and Physique Sports Federation.

=== List of National Sports award recipients in Bodybuilding, showing the year, award, and gender ===
Year	Recipient	Award	Gender
1978–1979	Monotosh Roy	Arjuna Award	Male
1979–1980	Sunil Kumar Patra	Arjuna Award	Male
1986	Premchand Degra	Arjuna Award	Male
1998	T. V. Pauly	Arjuna Award	Male
2019	S. Bhaskaran	Arjuna Award	Male
