= Child's Pose =

Child's Pose may refer to:

- Bālāsana, a yoga posture
- Child's Pose (film), a 2013 Romanian drama film
