= Pizza effect =

Phenomenon of foreign sources shaping a community's self-understanding

In religious studies and sociology, the pizza effect is the phenomenon of elements of a nation's or people's culture being transformed or at least more fully embraced elsewhere, then re-exported to their culture of origin, or the way in which a community's self-understanding is influenced by (or imposed by, or imported from) foreign sources. Related phrases include "hermeneutical feedback loop", "re-enculturation", and "self-orientalization".

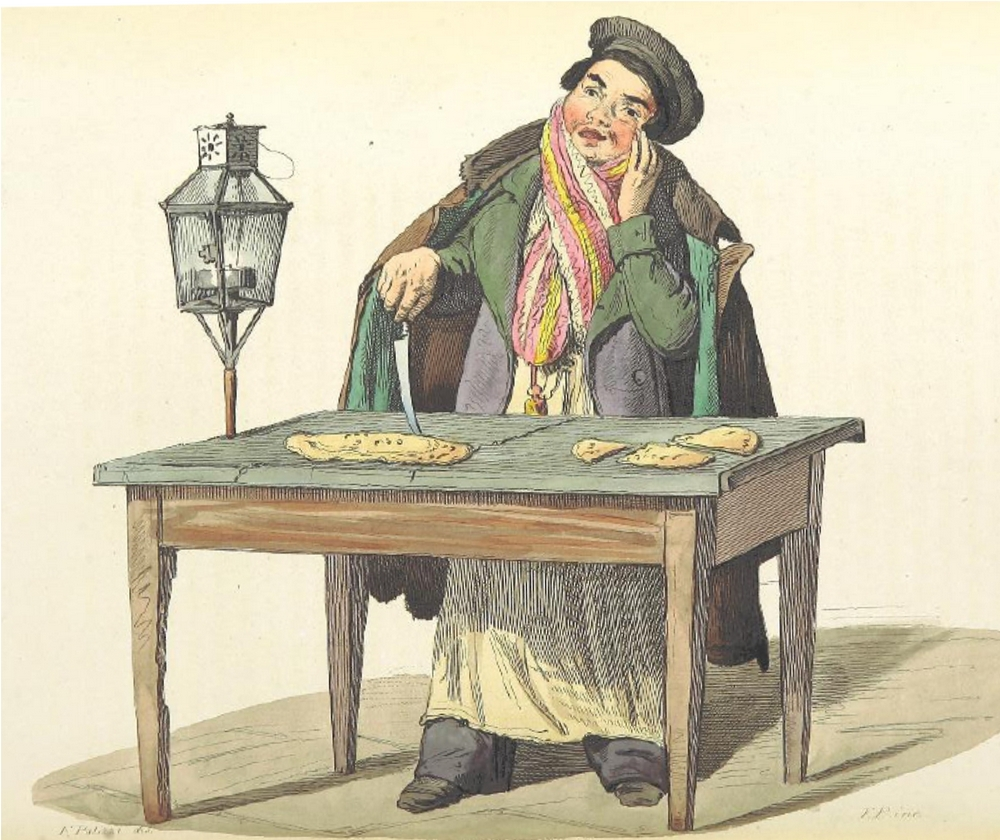
Traditional, 19th-century Italian pizza was more akin to a flatbread than modern associations

The term "pizza effect" was coined by the Austrian-born Hindu monk and professor of Anthropology at Syracuse University, Agehananda Bharati, who wrote the following in 1970, based on his analysis of this phenomenon.

The original pizza was a simple, hot-baked bread without any trimmings, the staple of the Calabrian and Sicilian contadini ["peasant-farmers"] from whom well over 90% of all Italo-Americans descend. After World War I, a highly elaborated dish, the U.S. pizza of many sizes, flavors, and hues, made its way back to Italy with visiting kinsfolk from America. The term and the object have acquired a new meaning and a new status, as well as many new tastes in the land of its origin, not only in the south, but throughout the length and width of Italy.

— Agehananda Bharati

== Examples ==
=== Original meaning ===
The original examples given by Agehananda Bharati mostly had to do with popularity and status:

- The Apu trilogy films of Satyajit Ray, which were flops in India before they were given prizes in Western countries and re-evaluated as classics of the Indian cinema
- The popularity in India of movements like those of Maharishi Mahesh Yogi and ISKCON based on their popularity in the West
- The popularity of postural yoga in India, several gurus, and some other Indian systems and teachings following their popularity in the West
- The exalted status of the Bhagavad Gita in Hinduism, where, although it was always highly regarded, it gained its current prominence only following Western attempts to identify a single canonical "Hindu Bible"

=== Contemporary understanding ===
==== Buddhism ====
The founders of the Theosophical Society, Helena Blavatsky and Henry Steel Olcott, were influenced by Eastern religions, then placed their headquarters in Adyar, Chennai, from where they spread their views within India.

Similarly, Buddhist modernism or "Protestant Buddhism" was developed by Westerners who, according to scholar Stephen Jenkins, "mistook it for an indigenous Sri Lankan product", and they in turn influenced Sri Lankan Buddhist Anagarika Dharmapala, who, along with the Theosophical Society, was instrumental in spreading Buddhism in both India and the West.

According to scholar Kim Knott, Mahatma Gandhi "was not very interested in religion until he went to London to study law, where he studied the Bhagavad Gita in English in Sir Edwin Arnold's translation, and this deeply influenced his spiritual outlook."

Another example of this effect is the influence of the translations of the British-based Pali Text Society on modern South Asian Buddhism.

==== Mexico ====
Cholo culture is an invention of Chicanos in California, especially Los Angeles. Today, the fashion of Cholos is finding its way into Mexico in a reinterpreted form.

The Day of the Dead Parade in Mexico City was inspired by an event in the James Bond film Spectre, which was fictional when the film was produced.

==== Ireland ====
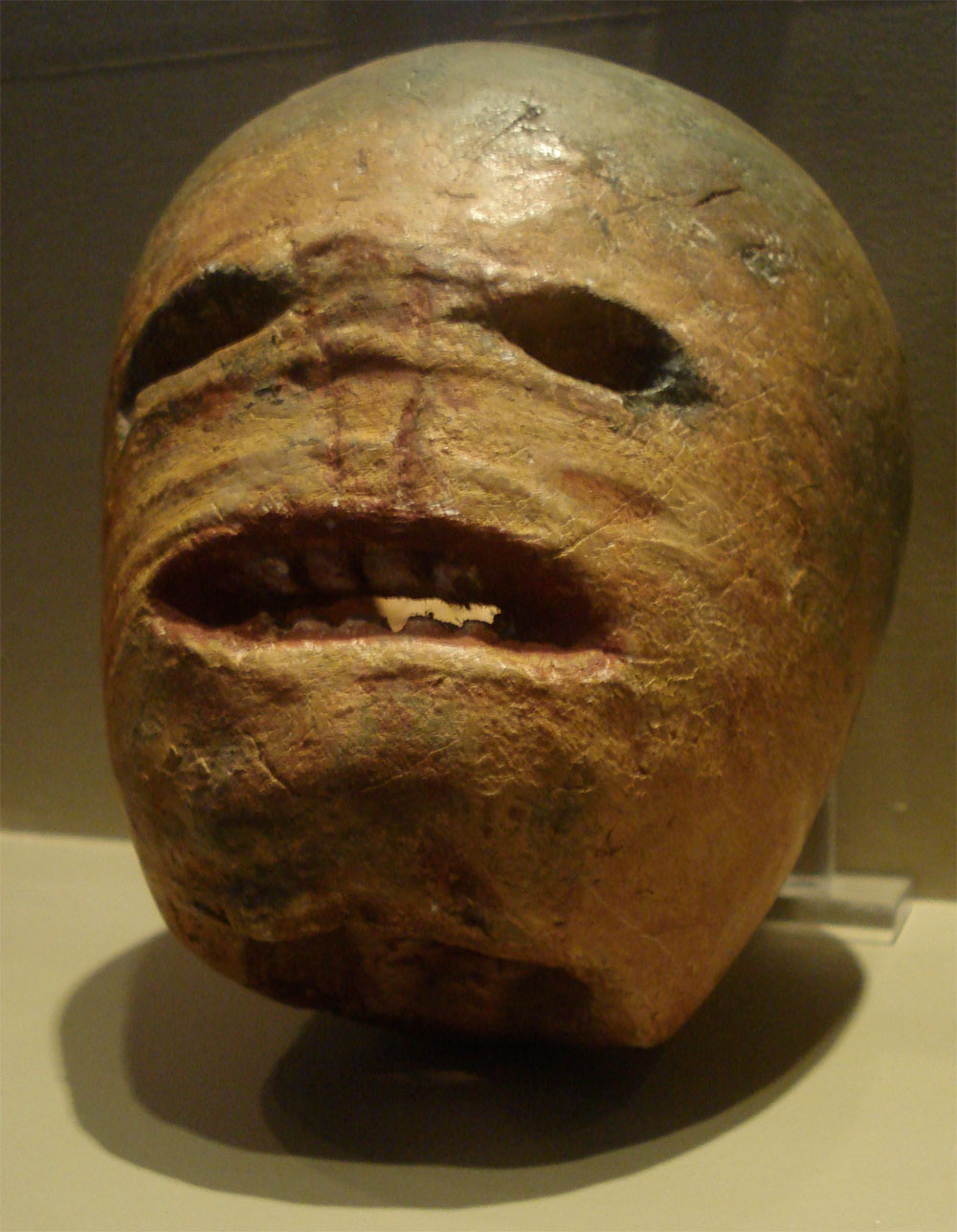
Model of a traditional Irish jack-o-lantern, carved from a turnip

The creation of jack-o'-lanterns from turnips (rutabaga) was a Halloween custom in Ireland and parts of Great Britain. Irish immigrants brought this tradition with them to the United States, and adapted it to use native pumpkins instead of turnips. In time, pumpkins came to be used instead of turnips to create jack-o'-lanterns in Ireland and Great Britain.

St Patrick's Day, and the parades associated with it, were first made festival events by Irish Americans; in fact, Dublin did not hold a St Patrick's Day parade until 1931. The Irish traditional music revival of the 1960s–70s was partially begun in the United States. The leprechaun is a very minor figure in Irish myth and folklore; they were popularized in Irish U.S. and are only seen in Ireland in tourist contexts, such as in souvenir shops and at the National Leprechaun Museum.

==== Islam ====
The religious thought of Ibn Rushd (Averroes), which was taken up by 19th-century Europeans such as Ernest Renan, and thereby regained popularity during the Nahda, the Islamic renaissance.

Analyst Mark Sedgwick wrote that Islamist terrorism, and specifically suicide bombing, can be seen as examples, beginning as isolated interpretations of the concept of shahid, or martyrdom, then being re-exported to the greater Muslim world.

==== Other examples ====
Ramen, a Japanese noodle dish of Chinese origin, became popular in China where it is known as rìshì lāmiàn (日式拉麵, lit. 'Japanese-style lamian').

Teppanyaki, a Western-influenced cuisine style created in Japan, became popular in the U.S and Canada, where it is often called hibachi.

Salsa music: the first salsa bands were mainly Puerto Ricans who moved to New York in the 1930s.

Haoqiu zhuan, a Chinese novel. James St. André, author of "Modern Translation Theory and Past Translation Practice: European Translations of the Haoqiu zhuan", wrote that in China the novel was originally "considered second-rate fiction and stood in danger of being completely forgotten with changes in literary taste in the early twentieth century." He stated that the fact there had been interest in translating the novel into English "gave life and fame" to Haoqiu zhuan and therefore affected its standing in China.

=== Variants ===
Scholar Jørn Borup wrote about an "inverted pizza-effect", when a society's modification of another culture gets further re-modified by that same society, such as European philosophers including Martin Heidegger "appear to have been significantly inspired by Eastern thought – an Eastern thought itself presented through 'Protestant' or 'Western' eyes. This transformation is naturally not a unique phenomenon in religious studies, where interpretations, re-interpretations and inventions are seen as common characteristics of religion."

Stephen Jenkins noted that the feedback phenomenon could continue; in the case of pizza, he wrote that the return of pizza to Italy again influenced American cuisine: "pizza-loving American tourists, going to Italy in the millions, sought out authentic Italian pizza. Italians, responding to this demand, developed pizzerias to meet American expectations. Delighted with their discovery of 'authentic' Italian pizza, Americans subsequently developed chains of 'authentic' Italian brick-oven pizzerias. Hence, Americans met their own reflection in the other and were delighted."

Jim Douglas, familiar with Bharati's thesis, applied it to blues music originating in the United States before 1960. The music of African American artists like Robert Johnson, Muddy Waters was embraced by rock musicians in the United Kingdom. Then, this re-packaged blues came back to the US presented by the Rolling Stones, Cream, Led Zeppelin, etc. in the late 1960s where it was embraced by Americans (who had never heard of Robert Johnson, etc.). Later, some of these Americans discovered the roots of the British blues-rock in the recordings of the original American Blues artists. Some of those influenced by this British Invasion went on to form garage rock bands, which later influenced the first wave of punk music in the UK.

== See also ==
- Coals to Newcastle
- Invented tradition
- Transculturation
