= Moloy Roy =

Indian bodybuilder

Moloy Roy মলয় রায়
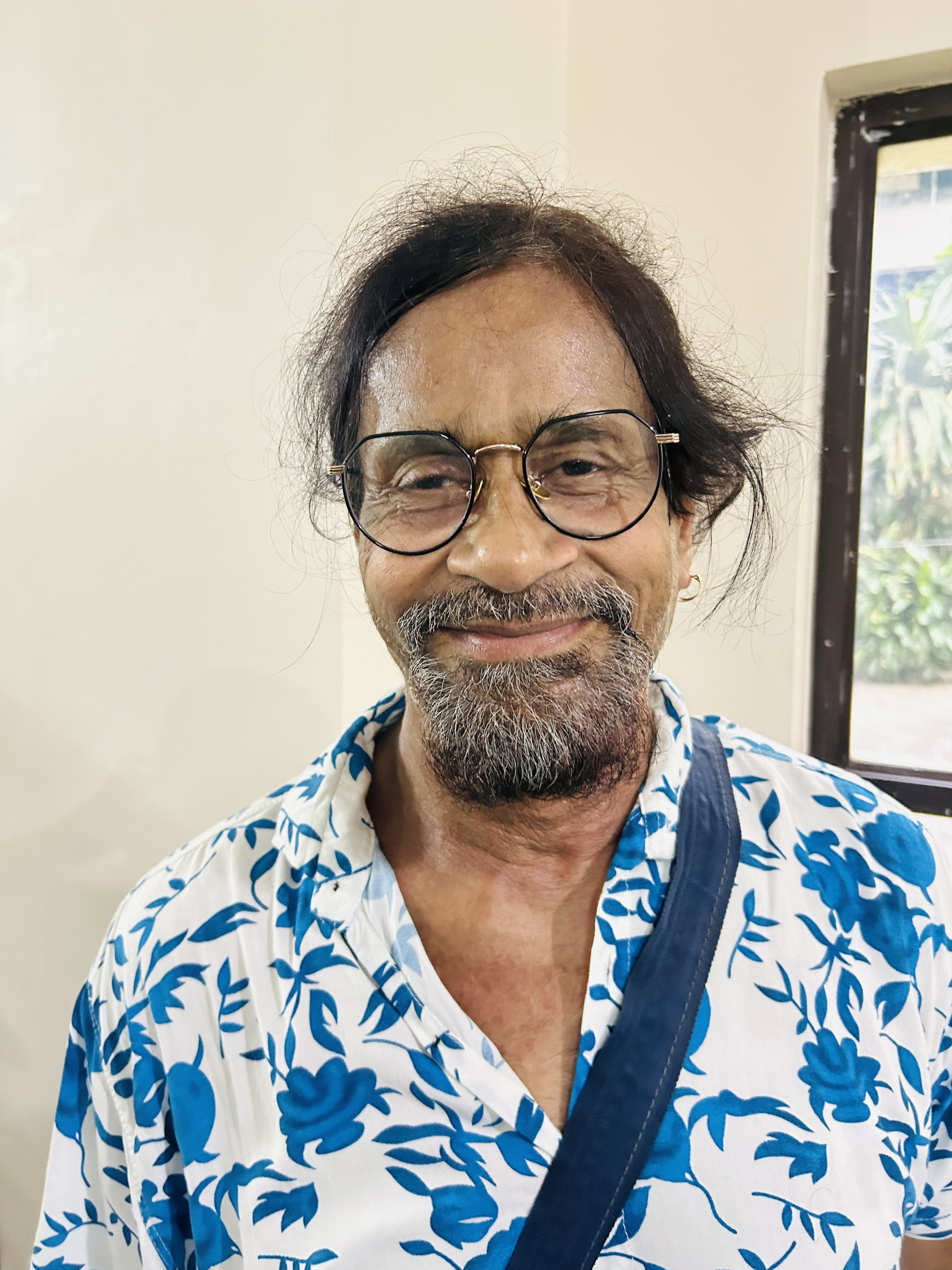
- Born: Calcutta, Bengal Presidency, British India
- Occupation: Body Builder
- Children: 1
- Parent: Monotosh Roy (father)

Moloy Roy (Bengali: মলয় রায়) is an Indian bodybuilder, a recipient of the Arjuna Award, and a winner (several times) of both the Mr. India and the Mr. Asia titles. He has also acted in Indian films.

== Early life ==
Moloy Roy was born into a family of bodybuilders. His father Monotosh Roy was not only a well-known bodybuilder in his time, but the first Asian (and thus, of course, the first Indian) to hold the Mr. Universe title, which he won in the Group III Amateur Division in 1951.

Roy started exercising at an early age, inspired by his father; many other bodybuilders visited his house regularly, including his father's mentor Bishnu Charan Ghosh, and their encouragement helped him as well.

== Career ==
Roy was a successful bodybuilder, and won several titles and awards in his career. He won the Mr. India title eight times, and Mr. Asia three times.

He also acted in Indian films, notably Satyajit Ray's Joi Baba Felunath, where he performed as the bodybuilder "Gunamoy Bagchi".

In addition, over his working life he held a variety of day jobs, ranging from a position in the Income tax department to work at Rifle Factory Ishapore.

== Later life ==
Roy has a daughter. His wife died in 2000.

He continues to take care of the multi-gym near their house, which his father Monotosh Roy set up in 1998. At the age of 74 (as of 2021), he exercises there daily.
