= Hastapadasana =

Hastapadasana ("Hand-to-Foot Pose") is any of several asanas in modern yoga where the hands grasp one or both feet:

- Utthita Pādāṅguṣṭhāsana, a standing pose in which one leg is raised to the face and grasped
- Uttanasana, the standing forward bend
- Upavishta Konasana, the wide-angle seated forward bend.
