= Hot yoga =

Yoga as exercise performed in hot conditions

Hot Yoga
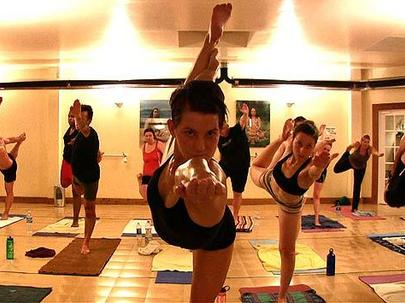

Characteristics
- Type: Yoga
- Venue: Hot yoga is typically performed in a room heated to 105 degrees Fahrenheit (40,5 °C) with a humidity of 40%.

Presence
- Country or region: Canada, India, UK, USA

Hot yoga is a form of yoga as exercise performed under hot and humid conditions, resulting in considerable sweating. Some hot yoga practices seek to replicate the heat and humidity of India, where yoga originated. Bikram Choudhury has suggested that the heated environment of Bikram Yoga helps to prepare the body for movement and to "remove impurities".

== Styles ==
The first style described as hot yoga is that of Bikram Choudhury, who claimed to have devised it from traditional hatha yoga techniques, but then increased the temperature of the studios while in Japan to represent the heat of India. Bikram Yoga resulted, and became popular in the early 1970s after Choudhury moved to the United States. The style incorporates 26 asanas and 2 breathing exercises along with a room heated to 105 °F (41 °C). Each class is 90 minutes long and has a fixed sequence of movements. The class ends with a two-minute shavasana (corpse pose). Bikram Yoga differs markedly from other hot yoga styles, as shown in the table. Bikram yoga classes are generally consistent in terms of the same class and temperature, regardless of the teacher or location. In hot yoga, the teacher creates their own routines, patterns, and movements for the class. The temperature will also vary by class depending on the number of bodies in the room and the selected temperature. In hot yoga, classes typically are shorter than Bikram classes and incorporate quick flow movements between poses.

=== Popularization ===
Approximately 13 million Americans participate in hot yoga, reflecting broader health and fitness trends, including the rise in group and fitness classes. In addition to its growing popularity due to perceived health benefits, hot yoga has gained traction through celebrity and influencer endorsements, aesthetic workout sets, and a specific lifestyle appeal. Major studio chains, such as CorePower Yoga, have also contributed to the growth of hot yoga, as they frequently have long waitlists for classes due to high demand. The popularization of hot yoga reflects broader trends in fitness, with exercise shaped by social media, consumer culture, and branding.

Differences	Bikram Yoga	Hot yoga (in general)
Poses	Fixed sequence of 26 postures	Varied asanas in varying sequences
Temperature, humidity	105 °F (41 °C), 40% humidity	80–100 °F (27–38 °C), varied humidity
Lighting	Bright lights, mirrored front wall	Any lighting, e.g. candles; mirrors optional
Training	Bikram-certified	Any
Sound	No music, no clapping	Music is common; applause is common at the end
Interaction	Instructors do not adjust students: students self-adjust using mirror-wall; students may not talk	Adjustments can be used; interaction is permitted

Forrest Yoga is a style developed by Ana T. Forrest, c. 1982. The style focuses on holding poses for a longer duration. The repetition of twenty specific poses accentuates the stretch equally on each side of the body.

CorePower Yoga, founded in 2002, is a vigorous multi-disciplinary hot yoga style.

Baron Baptiste Power Yoga has the room heated somewhat less than Bikram Yoga. Baptiste, who learnt yoga from T. K. V. Desikachar and B. K. S. Iyengar as a boy, and had Indra Devi as godmother, uses a Vinyasa (flow) style, the breath linked to the movements, with emphasis on the gaze (Drishti) and the use of a lock, Uddiyana Bandha, to stabilize the core.

Moksha yoga, also known as Modo Yoga, is based on Bikram Yoga. Moksha Yoga was founded in Canada in 2004 by human rights and environmental activists Jessica Robertson and Ted Grand.

Tribalance Hot Yoga, created in Schaumburg, Illinois by Corey Kelly and Shawnda Falvo in 2007, is based on Bikram and Yin Yoga; it does not have a fixed series of asanas, and emphasises the meditational aspect of yoga.

Buti Yoga, created by Bizzie Gold in 2012, by combining traditional Vinyasa style flow yoga with dynamic dance movements.

== Motivations and appeal ==
Hot yoga's popularity has been attributed to both its physical intensity and its perceived mental and lifestyle benefits. The elevated temperature causes the body to work harder to regulate your temperature, which can increase the perceived effectiveness of the workout. Many styles of yoga have evidence supporting an antidepressant effect. Yoga, a form of meditation, is one of many types of mind body practices that allows people to become more aware and live in their body, enhancing a sense of embodiment.

Yoga is recognized as a form of mind-body medicine that integrates an individuals physical, mental, and spiritual components to improve aspects of health, particularly stress related illness. The heated environment and structured class format can also contribute to a sense of accomplishment and satisfaction following sessions. People frequently report feeling relaxed and energized after classes, describing calm and post class bliss that distinguishes hot yoga from other forms of exercise. The latter is calming and restorative; it lowers breathing and heart rate, decreases blood pressure, lowers cortisol levels, and increases blood flow to the intestines and vital organs. People with the lowest well being may get the most out of yoga, but the moderating role of baseline well-being in the impact of hot yoga remains poorly understood. Hot yoga raises body temperature and heart rate, but energy expenditure is comparable to regular yoga.

== Contraindications ==
Exercise in high heat and humidity is a contraindication for pregnant women, as there is an increased risk of exhaustion, and hence muscle injury and cartilage and tissue damage. Hormones and fetal development affect blood pressure, making the mother also more susceptible to fainting and lightheadedness if exercising in a hot environment.

Multiple sclerosis (MS) is a degenerative disease that affects nearly one million people in the United States according to a report from the National Multiple Sclerosis Society . MS causes muscle spasms and mobility issues, yoga is considered to be a powerful exercise for those with MS as it can increase strength, mobility, flexibility, and balance which is important because those with the condition are weaker in those areas. Unfortunately, it is recommended that those with MS avoid hot yoga as the heat can cause symptoms to worsen, according to Dr. Mehta at Massachusett General Hospital.
