= Vishwas Vasant Mandlik =

Yogi

Vishwas Mandlik
- Born: Nasik, Maharashtra, India
- Occupation(s): Yoga teacher, author
- Spouse: Pournima Mandlik
- Children: Gandhar Mandlik

Vishwas Mandlik, better known as Mandlik sir, was the founder of the "Yoga Vidya Dham" and is considered one of the foremost yoga teachers in India. He has written many books on yoga practice and philosophy. On 6 March 2007, Paramhansa Niranjananda Saraswati of Bihar Yoga, initiated him to Rushi Sannayasa (part of higher sannayasa tradition) and gave new name Rushi Dharmajyoti.

== Awards ==
1. Recipient of “Prime Minister’s Award for outstanding contribution towards promotion and development of YOGA” in 2018
2. Prime Minister's National Yoga Award in 2018

== Gallery ==
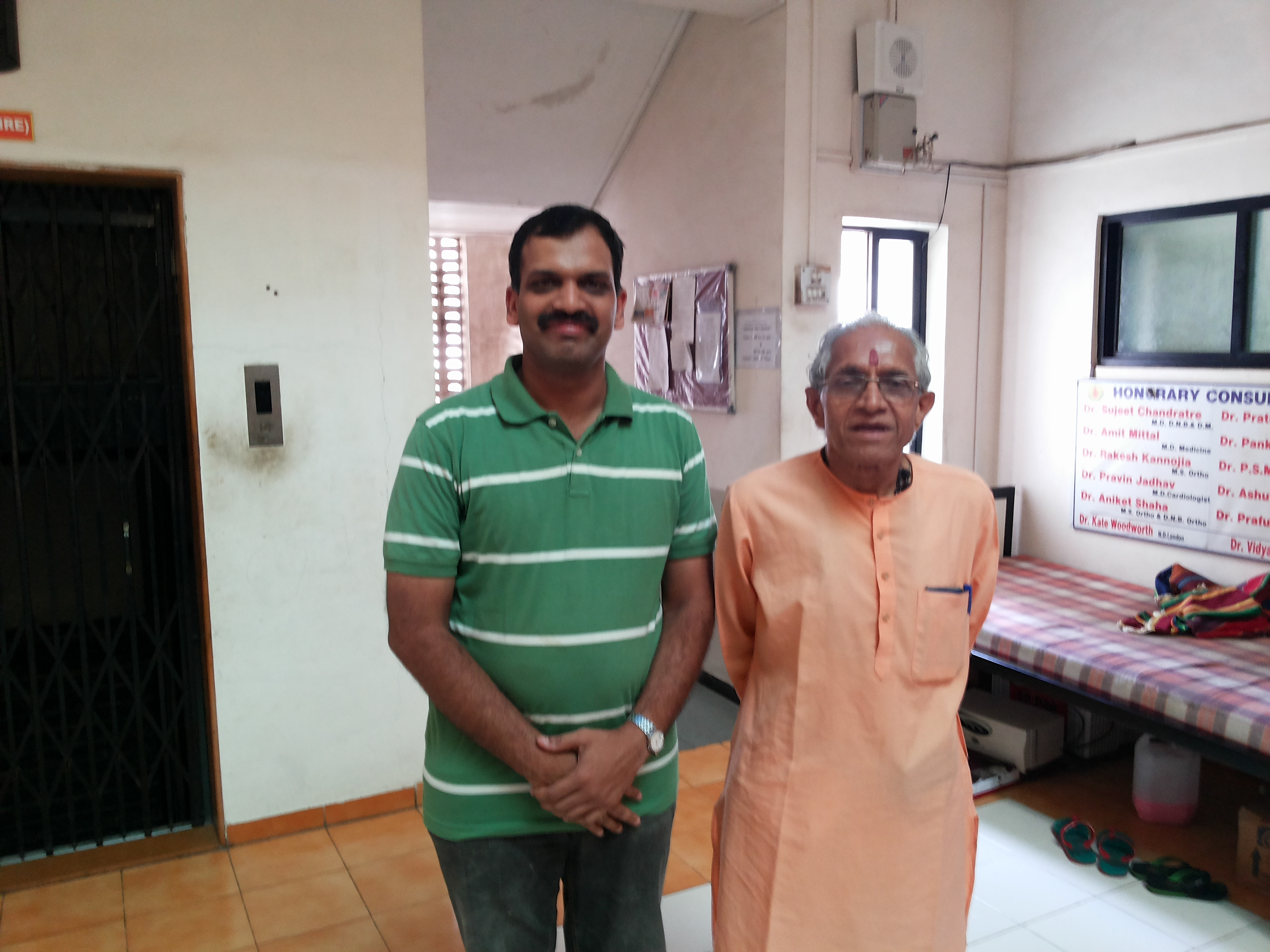
Vishwas Mandlik with his followers

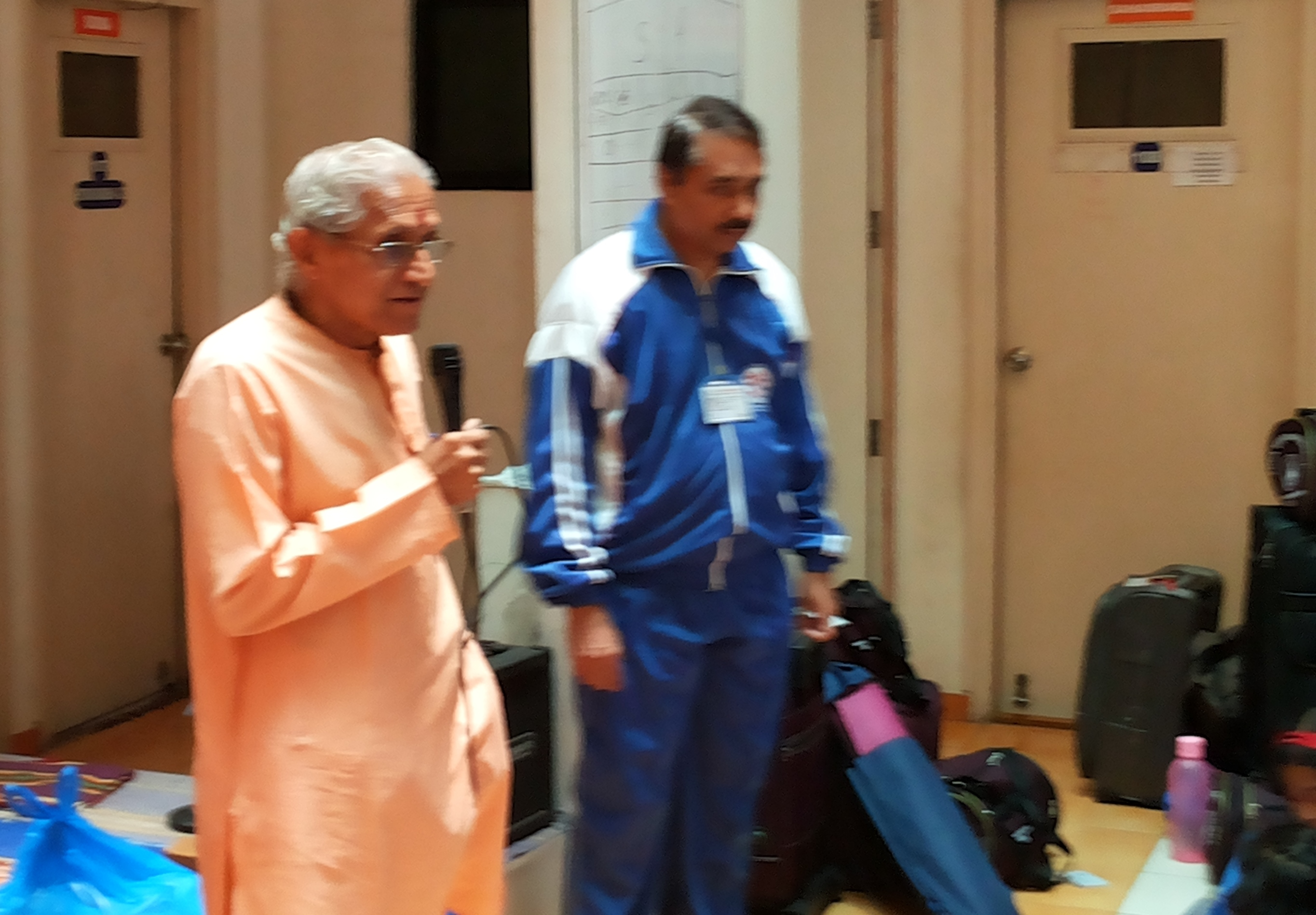
Vishwas Mandlik with his shishya

== Books written ==
- Ashtang Yoga (Yoga the Science)
