= Reba Rakshit =

Reba Rakshit (Bengali: রেবা রক্ষিত; 1933–2010) was an Indian bodybuilder and exponent of yoga who was a pupil of Bishnu Charan Ghosh at the College of Physical Culture in Kolkata and specialized in withstanding heavy weights upon her body. She would let fully loaded cars or elephants pass over her body. She was the first Indian woman to lift an elephant upon her chest.

== Early life ==
Reba was born in Comilla in a Bengali Hindu family sometime in the early 1930s. From girlhood she had interest in physical culture. After the Partition, she migrated to Kolkata along with her family. In Kolkata, she joined the akhada of Bishnu Charan Ghosh, where she trained alongside Monotosh Roy and Kamal Bhandari. In the early 1950s she was awarded the title Miss Bengal for bodybuilding.

== Career ==
Reba began to perform in the circus from the early fifties. One of her astonishing feats was lifting elephants upon her chest. She continued this act till the mid 1960s. She was associated with Kamala Circus, International Circus and Gemini Circus. She also used to perform at the local clubs in Kolkata during the Durga Puja. She was also a good shooter. In her later life, she became a physical trainer and was associated with social works.

== Awards ==
She was awarded Padmashri for her achievements. The Nawab of Hyderabad bestowed upon her the title of Devi Chaudhurani.
