= Monotosh Roy =

Indian bodybuilder (1916–2004)

- Born: 21 October 1916; Gajaria, Dacca, Bengal Presidency, British India
- Died: 29 June 2004 (aged 87); Calcutta, West Bengal, India
- Occupation: Body Builder
- Children: Moloy Roy (son)

Monotosh Roy (21 October 1916 – 29 June 2004) was an Indian bodybuilder, who held the Mr. Universe title in Group III Amateur Division in 1951. Roy was the first Indian, Bengali and Asian to be awarded the Mr. Universe title.

== Early life ==
Roy was born in a Bengali family in Gajaria village in Dhaka district, on the banks of Meghna river in East Bengal, present day Bangladesh. In his childhood, Roy had to struggle against poverty. He attended an English-medium middle school. He began exercising at the age of 12. He considered Bishnu Charan Ghosh to be his guru. He would always keep a photo of Bishnu Charan Ghosh in front of him. One day Bishnu Charan Ghosh saw him working out and accepted him as his pupil.

== Career ==
In 1939, he competed in his first bodybuilding competition, but did not fare well. He resolved for success and engaged himself in further practice. In 1939, he won the East Indian Bodybuilding Championship. In 1947, he won the All India Bodybuilding Championship.

In 1951, Roy travelled to the United Kingdom and participated in the Mr. Universe competition. He won the Mr. Universe title in Group III Amateur Division category. The audience at the competition were mesmerised by his muscle display. They queued up for his autograph and even waited up to two and half hours for his autograph. Following his victory at the Mr. Universe competition, he was felicitated at the India House by the Indian High Commissioner.

After his return to India he acted as a trainer in many physical culture clubs. He used to train fitness and yoga to celebrities. He founded the Indian Bodybuilding Federation in 1958. He was also the founding member of Asian Bodybuilding Federation. He also taught at the Calcutta University and the Law College. He became a featured columnist in periodicals on health and fitness. He also wrote a few books on Yoga. He conducted bodybuilding programmes that were telecast in the Doordarshan. He set up several bodybuilding and yoga centres in Kolkata.

== Later life ==
In 1998, he set up a multigym near his home in Kolkata. In his later years he became bed ridden. Roy died in 2004 following a cardiac arrest.

== Legacy ==
After his death his multigym is run by his son Moloy Roy, a recipient of the Arjuna Award and eight time Mr. India. After his death the Sports Minister and PWD Minister visited his residence and promised them to rename the Barrackpore Trunk Road after him.
