= Bikram Choudhury =

Indian yoga teacher Bikram Yoga

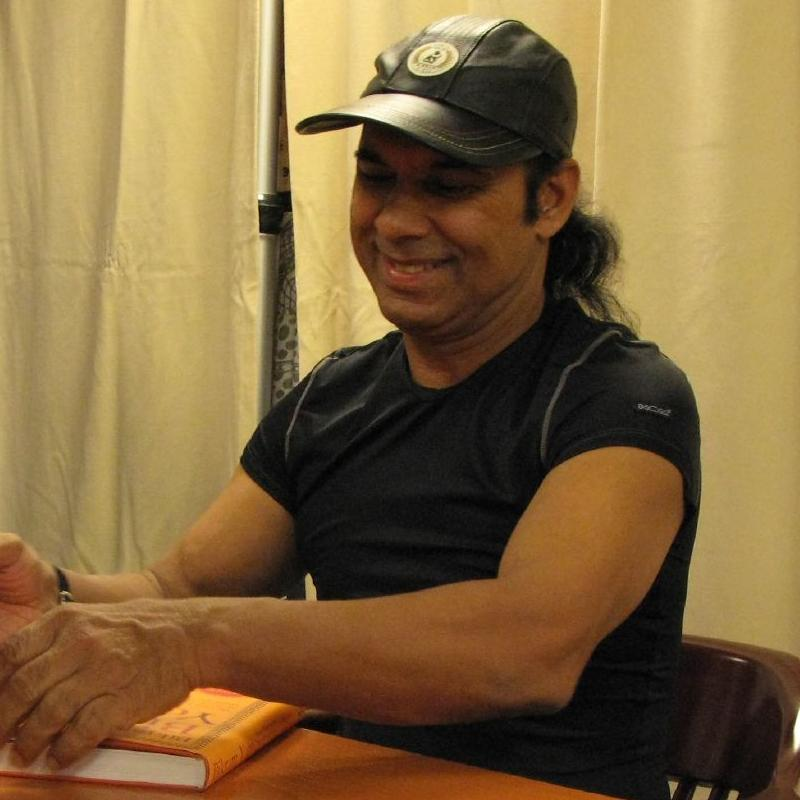
- At a book signing in New York in 2007
- Born: 1944; Calcutta, British India
- Occupation: Yoga
- Known for: Founder of Bikram Yoga
- Spouse: Rajashree Choudhury (m. 1984; div. 2016)

Bikram Choudhury (born 1944) is an Indian-American yoga guru, and the founder of Bikram Yoga, a form of hot yoga consisting of a fixed series of 26 postures practised in a hot environment of 40 °C (104 °F). The business became a success in the United States and then across the Western world, with a variety of celebrity pupils. His former wife Rajashree Choudhury assisted him in the yoga business.

In 2009, he began a series of copyright claims to protect the series of postures of Bikram Yoga; this was ultimately unsuccessful, and other studios continue to teach the series.

Choudhury was the subject of civil suits alleging sexual assault and discrimination against racial and sexual minorities. In 2017, a court awarded $7 million to his former lawyer, Minakshi Jafa-Bodden, who gained control of his yoga business when Choudhury fled to India without paying her. Since then he has continued to train yoga teachers outside the United States in countries including Spain and Mexico.

== Life, Work, and Controversy ==
=== Early life ===
Bikram Choudhury was born in Calcutta, British India in 1944. He claimed to have begun studying yoga under Bishnu Charan Ghosh, and to have won the National India Yoga Championship for three consecutive years in his teens. However, the first ever Yoga competition in India took place in 1974, long after he had left the country. Recent evidence from interviews for the podcast series "30for30" on Choudhury (2018, ESPN) and from Jerome Armstrong's book, Calcutta Yoga, have proven his claim of winning the National India Yoga Championships to be false and also that he did not start his training under Ghosh at the age of 5 but rather in 1962 when he was 18. His initial focus was on bodybuilding and massage. A few years later, during 1969, Bikram completed in six months his training on Asanas under Ghosh and other senior teachers, but he did not get the chance to finish his training on Pranayama (breathing exercises), Bandha (bodily locks) or Dhyāna (focused meditation) before Ghosh died in 1970.

Choudhury developed a 26-posture series, by piecing together existing sequences from over 500 poses and variations created by Ghosh, and put it into his signature series which takes about ninety minutes to perform. The 104 °F (40 °C) heat in which Bikram Yoga is practiced is, according to Choudhury, meant to mimic the climate of India. Choudhury was closely associated with the United States's competitive yoga from its inception; the annual Bishnu Charan Ghosh Cup is named after his teacher.

=== Yoga in the United States ===
In 1971, Choudhury immigrated to the United States and began to teach yoga. He opened his first studio in Los Angeles, teaching his own style of yoga. The author Brigid Delaney describes the atmosphere around him as "fawning": he was, she writes, treated reverentially, as if he were a guru, though he was a "braggart" openly boasting about the film stars he had taught and the money he had made. He was rude and insulting to students; in Netflix's 2019 documentary film, Bikram: Yogi, Guru, Predator directed by Eva Orner, he uses abusive language and jeers at overweight pupils. The critic Adrian Horton writes that the film "visually synthesizes decades of archival footage with first-person testimony and filmed court depositions into a devastating portrait of an abusive narcissist protected from consequences by his own inflated cult of personality, wealth and professional power within the niche world of hot yoga."

All the same, Bikram Yoga expanded rapidly across the United States. In the 1990s, he began offering nine-week teacher certification courses, training thousands of instructors. Bikram Yoga studios were founded in many countries around the world. Choudhury taught celebrities such as the pop singers Madonna and Lady Gaga, and the footballer David Beckham, and claimed to have taught yoga to American presidents Richard Nixon, Ronald Reagan and Bill Clinton.

From 2009, Choudhury claimed that the series of 26 postures of his yoga practice, Bikram Yoga, was under copyright and could not be taught or presented by anyone whom he had not authorized. Choudhury began making copyright claims on Bikram Yoga in 2012. In 2011 Choudhury started a lawsuit against Yoga to the People, a competing yoga studio founded by a former student and with a location near one of the Bikram Yoga studios in New York City. As a result of that lawsuit, the United States Copyright Office issued a clarification that yoga postures (asanas) could not be copyrighted, and that Yoga to the People and others could continue to teach the series.

=== Sexual assault and harassment allegations ===
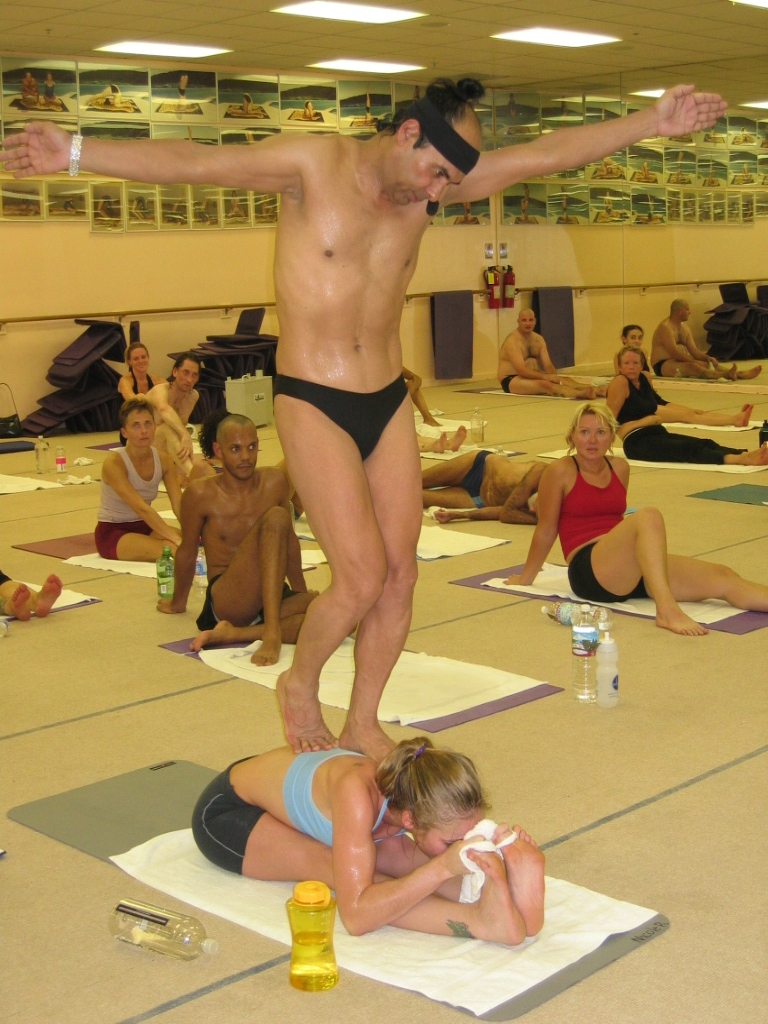
Choudhury assisting a pupil in Paschimottanasana in his own style

Choudhury has faced lawsuits alleging sexual harassment, assault, racism and homophobia. By January 2014, five women were suing Bikram Choudhury with allegations including sexual harassment and sexual assault. Two lawsuits accusing Bikram Choudhury of rape were filed in May 2013, with other counts of sexual battery, false imprisonment, discrimination, and harassment. One suit describes a cult-like atmosphere where members of Choudhury's inner circle help him find young women to assault. Another suit claims that Choudhury recruits volunteers from overseas who are "so in fear of defendant Bikram Choudhury's wrath that they will travel to the US and risk violating immigration laws in order to serve him." In 2016, Choudhury was ordered to pay a $6.8 million judgment for similar charges.

Minakshi Jafa-Bodden served as Head of Legal and International Affairs from Spring 2011 to March 13, 2013, when she was "abruptly and unlawfully terminated". During the two years that Jafa-Bodden worked closely with Choudhury, she was both the victim of and witness to Choudhury's "severe, ongoing, pervasive and offensive conduct" toward women, homosexuals, African Americans and other minorities. Bikram Yoga teacher Sarah Baughn filed a sexual harassment suit in March, just before Jafa-Bodden was fired. On January 25, 2016, a jury awarded Jafa-Bodden $924,500 against Choudhury in actual damages, finding that Choudhury acted with malice, oppression and fraud. On January 26, 2016, the jury awarded Jafa-Bodden an additional $6.4 million in punitive damages.

=== Life after leaving the United States ===
In May 2016, Choudhury returned to India, where he began opening yoga studios. In October 2016, Choudhury's attorney stated that his client would not return to the United States to defend himself in person at the other pending court cases. In a late 2016 interview on Real Sports with Bryant Gumbel, Bikram responded to the accusations by asking, "Why would I have to harass women? People spend one million dollars for a drop of my sperm", and calling his accusers "trash" and "psychopaths".

In May 2017, a Los Angeles judge issued a warrant for Choudhury's arrest, on the grounds that he had fled the country without paying any of the $7 million owed to Jafa-Bodden in compensation and punitive damages. The New York Daily News reported that luxury vehicles and other items of Choudhury's had been moved out of state, and that a court order preventing him from moving any of his other possessions out of warehouses in Florida and Nevada had been issued.

Despite Choudhury's departure in disgrace, people continued to attend his teacher trainings, such as in Murcia, Spain and Acapulco, Mexico in 2019. The yoga teacher Jessamyn Stanley called it "bizarre" that people would still take his trainings after all the rape allegations against him.

After the broadcast of the Netflix 2019 documentary Bikram: Yogi, Guru, Predator, multiple studios removed "Bikram Yoga" from their name and replaced it with the term "Hot Yoga" instead, while others chose to maintain it.

In January 2023, despite public outcry and the possibility of arrest, it was reported that Choudhury was planning to teach yoga and give lectures in Vancouver, British Columbia.

== Personal life ==
In 1984, Choudhury married Rajashree Choudhury, who assisted him in founding the United States Yoga Federation and the International Yoga Sports Federation (IYSF). She won the first National Yoga Championship held by the Yoga Federation of India in 1979, followed by four more consecutive years as National Yoga Champion. In December 2015, after 31 years of marriage, Rajashree filed for divorce citing irreconcilable differences. The divorce was finalized in May 2016. Rajashree was awarded the houses in Beverly Hills and Los Angeles, and some of his luxury cars, while he kept the apartment in Hawaii. The settlement indemnified Rajashree from financial responsibility in Bikram's pending (or possible future) lawsuits.

== Books ==
- Choudhury, Bikram; Reynolds, Bonnie Jones (2000) [1978]. J. Goldstein (ed.). Bikram's Beginning Yoga Class (New ed.). Thorsons. ISBN 978-0007154999.
- Choudhury, Bikram (2007). Bikram Yoga: The Guru Behind Hot Yoga Shows the Way to Radiant Health and Personal Fulfillment. HarperCollins Publishers. ISBN 978-0-06-056808-5.

== See also ==
- K. Pattabhi Jois
