= Utthita Padangusthasana =

Standing balancing posture in yoga as exercise

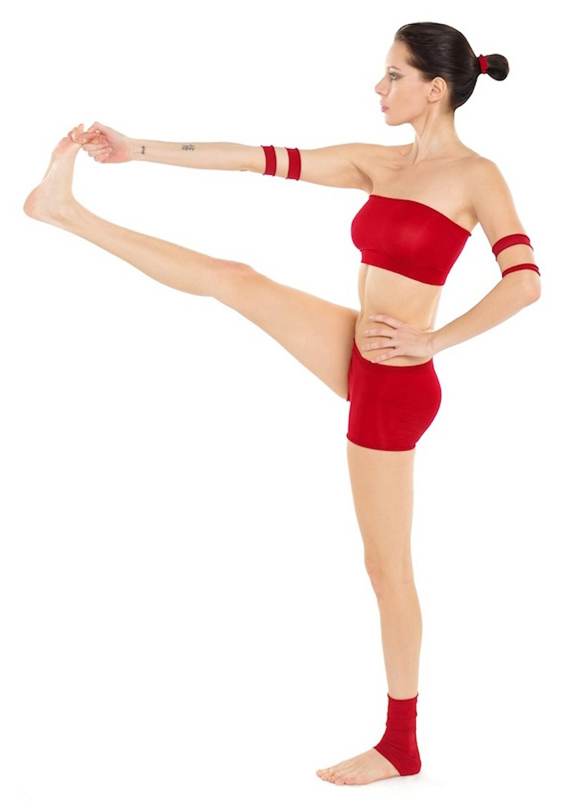
Utthita Padangusthasana I

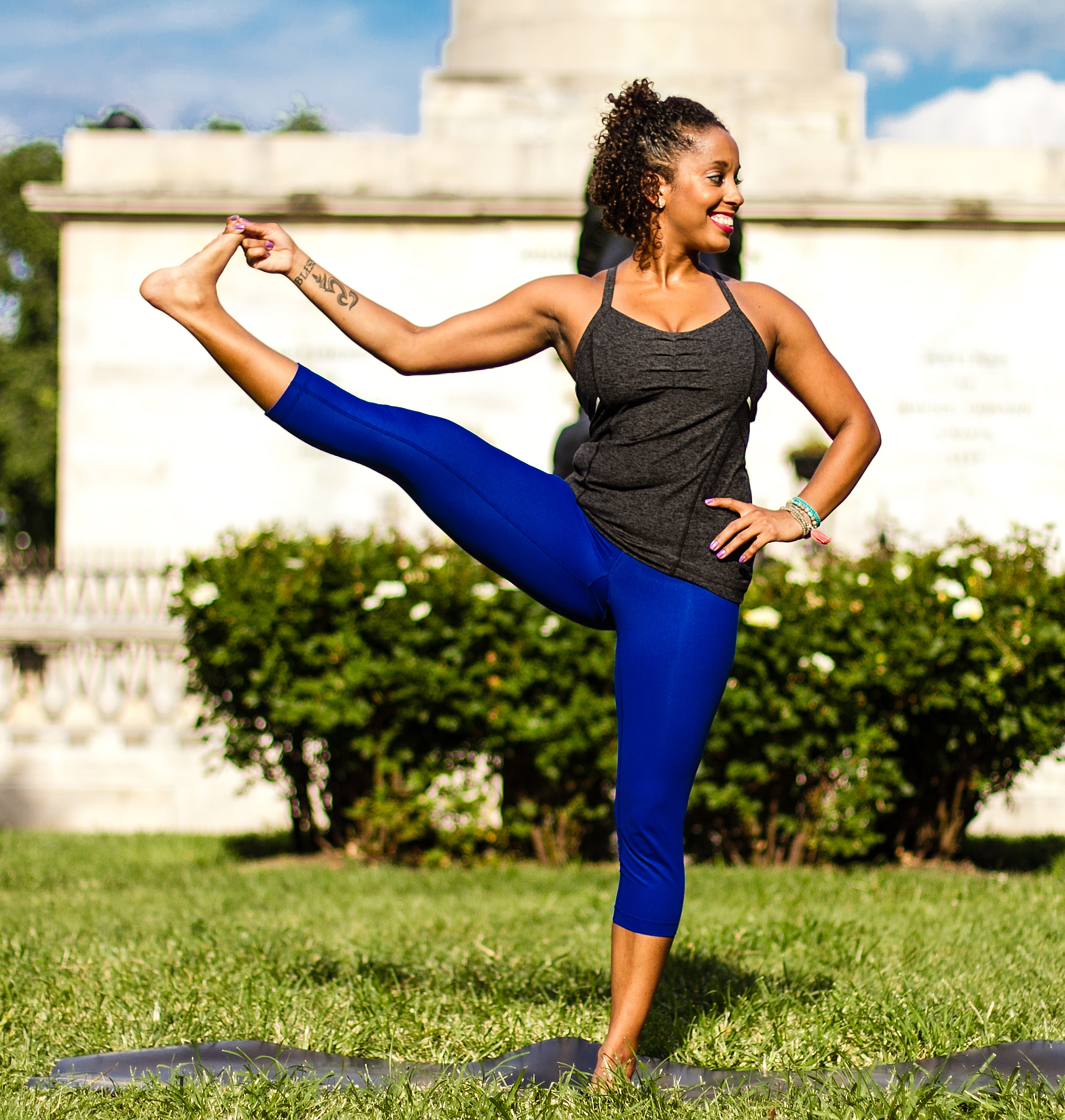
Utthita Padangusthasana II

Utthita Hasta Padangusthasana (Sanskrit: उत्थित हस्त पादाङ्गुष्ठासन, IAST: Utthita Hasta Pādāṅguṣṭhāsana), Standing Big Toe Hold or Extended Hand-to-Big-Toe Pose is a standing balancing asana in modern yoga as exercise.

== Etymology and origins ==
The name comes from the Sanskrit words Utthita (उत्थित) meaning "extended", Hasta (हस्त) meaning "hand", Pada (पद) meaning "foot", Angustha (ङ्गुष्ठ) meaning "thumb" or "toe", and Asana (आसन) meaning "posture" or "seat". {{efn|The name "Padangusthasana" (without "Utthita") is used with a different meaning in Bikram Yoga. "Toe Stand Pose" is number 12 in its asana sequence; it is a squatting pose with one leg lightly crossed over the standing leg, which is bent so that the buttocks approach or rest on the heel; despite the etymology there is no contact between hand and foot.

The pose however does not appear to be Indian in origin, and it is not found in the medieval hatha yoga texts. A similar pose was described in Niels Bukh's early 20th century Danish text Primitive Gymnastics, which in turn was derived from a 19th century Scandinavian tradition of gymnastics. The pose had arrived in India by the 1920s. Swami Kuvalayananda incorporated it into his system of exercises, from where it was taken up by the influential yoga teacher Tirumalai Krishnamacharya.

== Description ==
Utthita Padangusthasana is a pose with the body standing straight, on one leg; the other leg is stretched out straight, and the foot of the raised leg is grasped by the hand on the same side of the body. It is entered from the standing pose Tadasana. The pose has two forms: I, with the raised leg to the front, and the opposite hand to the hip; II, with the raised leg to the side, and the opposite hand stretched out straight to the other side. Students can practise the pose using a strap to hold the extended foot, or a ledge or wall for support; or may keep the knee bent. The pose is at the start of the Primary Series of Ashtanga (vinyasa) yoga.

== Variations ==
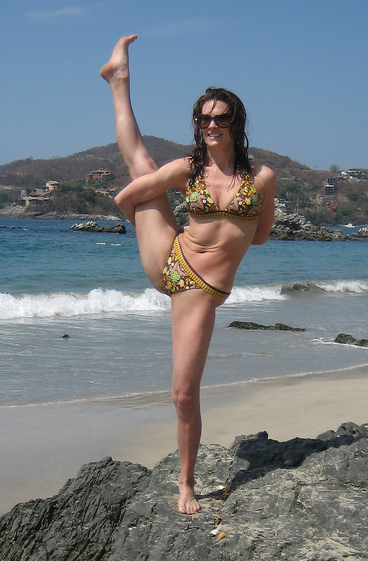
Svarga Dvijasana (Bird of Paradise pose) is a bound variant of Utthita Padangusthasana II.

Utthita Ekapadasana is a milder form of the same pose, the leg not lifted far enough for the toes to be grasped.

Utthita Parshvasahita has the raised leg out to the side and the head turned away from the raised leg.

Svarga Dvijasana (Bird of Paradise pose) has the raised leg out to the side, the hands clasped under the thigh with the arm on the raised leg side in front, the other arm behind.

== Sources ==
- Iyengar, B. K. S. (1979) [1966]. Light on Yoga: Yoga Dipika. Unwin Paperbacks.
- Mehta, Silva; Mehta, Mira; Mehta, Shyam (1990). Yoga: The Iyengar Way. Dorling Kindersley.
- Saraswati, Swami Satyananda (1996). Asana Pranayama Mudra Bandha (PDF). Yoga Publications Trust. ISBN 978-81-86336-14-4.
