= Bikram: Yogi, Guru, Predator =

2019 documentary film

- Film poster
- Directed by: Eva Orner
- Starring: Larissa Anderson; Francesca Asumah; Sarah Baughn
- Production company: Pulse Films
- Distributed by: Netflix
- Release dates: September 10, 2019 (Toronto International Film Festival); November 20, 2019 (Netflix)
- Running time: 86 minutes
- Country: United States
- Language: English

Bikram: Yogi, Guru, Predator is a 2019 documentary film directed by Eva Orner and starring Larissa Anderson, Francesca Asumah and Sarah Baughn. The premise revolves around Bikram Choudhury and how he built his yoga business.

The film premiered at the 2019 Toronto International Film Festival, and released on Netflix on November 20, 2019.

== Cast ==
- Larissa Anderson
- Francesca Asumah
- Sarah Baughn
- Bikram Choudhury
- John Dowd
- Ann Duong
- Mukul Dutta
- Micki Jafa-Bodden
- Carla Minnard
- Richard Nixon
- Bob Dole
- Mark Quigley
- Val Sklar Robinson
- Mandeep Kaur Sandhu
- Jakob Schanzer
- Patrice Simon

== Release ==
Bikram: Yogi, Guru, Predator was released on November 20, 2019, on Netflix.

== Reception ==
On Rotten Tomatoes, the film holds an approval rating of 96% based on 24 reviews, with an average rating of 6.80/10.
