= Yoga to the People =

Chain of United States-based yoga studios

Yoga to the People was a chain of United States–based yoga studios that offered free or donation-funded modern yoga classes to all types of student, including casual practitioners. It operated from 2006 until it closed in around 2020, after accusations of tax fraud and sexual assault.

== Operation ==
Yoga to the People had a pay what you want business model, to provide classes to all people regardless of their ability to pay. Yoga to the People founder Greg Gumucio created the cost model after the ideas of yoga teacher and Power Yoga founder Bryan Kest.

The studio in East Village, Manhattan had eight classes a day with up to 150 people in attendance at a time between the different rooms, and was sometimes at capacity.

== Bikram Yoga lawsuit ==
Bikram Choudhury claimed from 2002 onwards that his modern yoga practice, Bikram Yoga, was under copyright and that it could not be taught or presented by anyone whom he had not authorized. In 2011 he started a lawsuit against Yoga to the People. As a result of that lawsuit, the United States Copyright Office issued a clarification that yoga asanas could not be copyrighted in the way claimed by Bikram, and that Yoga to the People and others could continue to freely teach these exercises.

== Closure ==
In 2020, Gumucio was accused of sexual assault. In August 2022, the leaders of Yoga to the People were arrested for failing to file tax returns or pay taxes from at least 2013 to 2020.

As of 2025, the website remains open, allowing access to the original class podcasts.
