= Balasana =

Kneeling posture in modern yoga

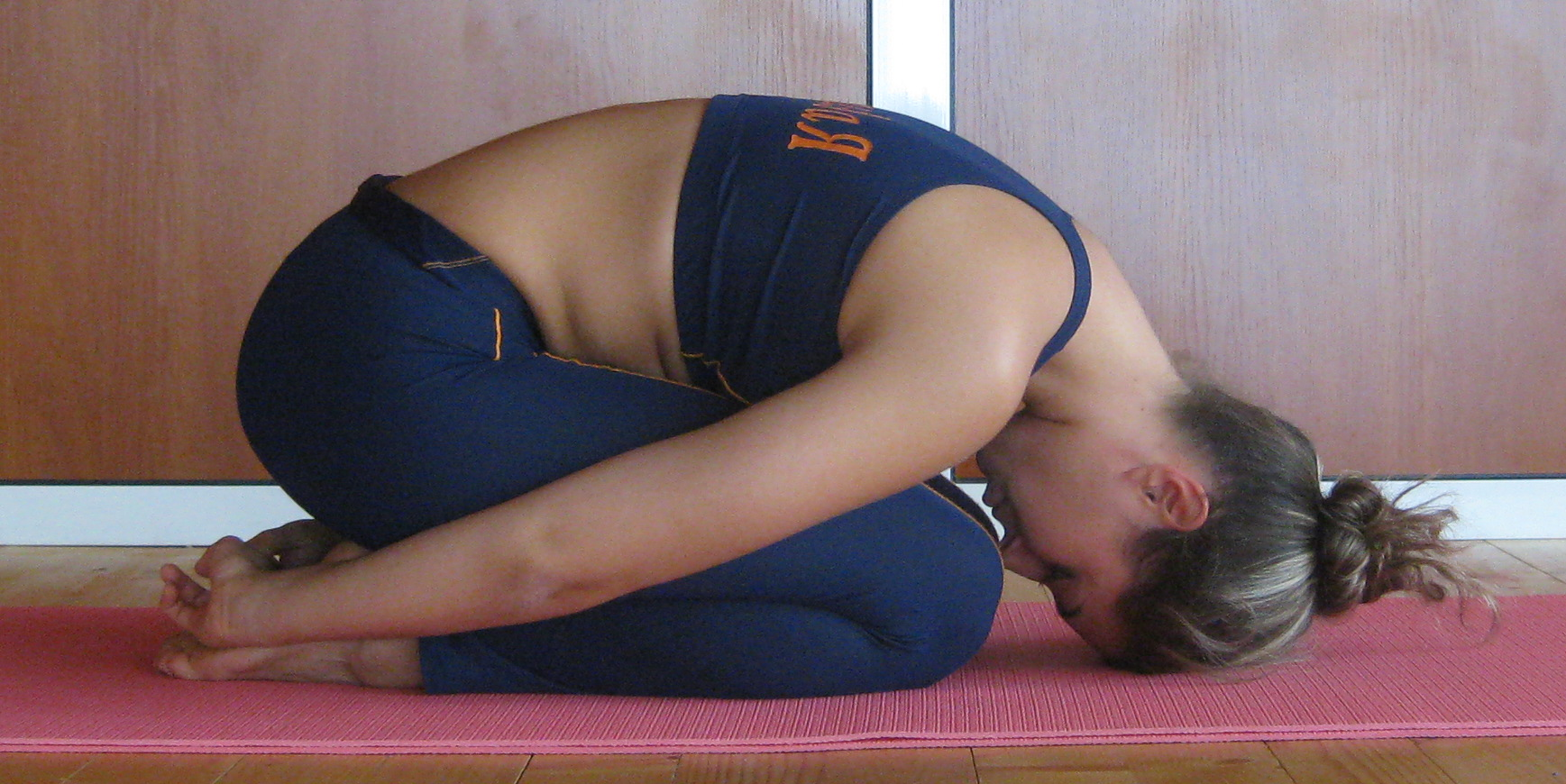
Balasana or Child Pose

Bālāsana (Sanskrit: बालासन) or Child Pose, is a kneeling asana in modern yoga as exercise. Balasana is a counter asana for various asanas and is usually practiced before and after Sirsasana.

== Etymology and origins ==
The name comes from the Sanskrit words बाल bala, "child" and आसन āsana, "posture" or "seat". Balasana is not described until the 20th century; a similar pose appears in Niels Bukh's 1924 Primary Gymnastics. Ananda Balasana is illustrated as Kandukasana (Ball Pose) in the 19th century Sritattvanidhi.

== Description ==
From a kneeling position, bring the forehead to the floor and relax the arms alongside the body, palms upwards.

== Variations ==
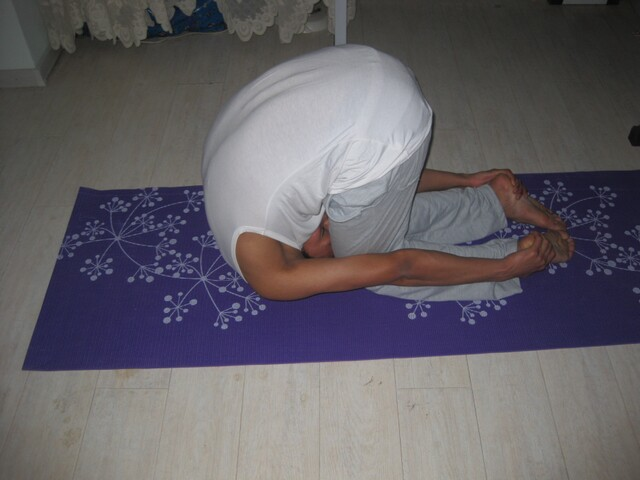
Rabbit pose

If need be, and during pregnancy, the knees can be spread. The arms may be stretched forward in front of the head. If there is discomfort in the neck and shoulders, a rolled blanket may be placed on the backs of the lower legs, and the forearms can be stacked and the forehead rested on them.

Uttana Shishosana or "Extended Puppy Pose" stretches forwards from all fours until the forearms and forehead are resting on the floor and the thighs are vertical, giving a pose intermediate between Balasana and Adho Mukha Shvanasana (Downward Dog Pose).

Parsva Balasana (Sanskrit: पार्श्व बालासन, 'Side child pose'), also called Sucirandhrasana (सुचिरंध्रासन), "Eye of the Needle Pose", or "Thread the Needle Pose", has the head and feet as in Balasana, the knees bent, the hips raised, and one shoulder on the floor, with the arm on that side stretched out in front of the face at right angles to the body along the floor. The other arm may be stretched forwards over the head, folded behind the back, or stretched straight up into the air.

== Similar poses ==
Shasangasana (शसांगासन) or "Rabbit Pose", practised in Bikram Yoga, has the tailbone lifted until the thighs are vertical and the head and arms point back towards the feet, creating an intense flexion of the spine.

== See also ==
- List of asanas
