= Postures of Bikram Yoga =

The following are the 26 postures of Bikram Yoga, as it names them; some of the Sanskrit names differ from those used for the same or closely related poses in other schools of yoga, and some of them are otherwise used for different poses. The postures include 24 asanas (poses in modern yoga as exercise), one pranayama breathing exercise, and one shatkarma, a purification making use of forced breathing. Bikram Yoga was devised by Bikram Choudhury around 1971 when he moved to America.

| # | Bikram Yoga's Sanskrit | Translation | Appearance | Nearest equivalent in other schools |
|---|---|---|---|---|
| 1 | प्राणायाम; Prāṇāyāma | Standing Deep Breathing | | (not an asana; Yoga breathing, usually practised sitting) |
| 2 | अर्धचन्द्रासन with पादहस्तासन; Ardhachandrāsana with Pādahastāsana | Half Moon Pose with Hands To Feet Pose | | Indudalasana |
| 3 | उत्कटासन; Utkaṭāsana | Awkward Pose | | Utkatasana |
| 4 | गरुडासन; Garuḍāsana | Eagle Pose | | Garudasana |
| 5 | दण्डायमन जानुशीर्षासन; Daṇḍāyamana Jānuśīrṣāsana | Standing Head To Knee Pose | | Utthita Padangusthasana |
| 6 | दण्डायमन धनुरासन; Daṇḍāyamana Dhanurāsana | Standing Bow Pose | | Natarajasana; Dancer Pose |
| 7 | तुलादण्डासन; Tulādaṇḍāsana | Balancing Stick Pose | | Virabhadrasana III; Warrior III |
| 8 | दण्डायमन विभक्तपाद पश्चिमोत्तानासन; Daṇḍāyamana Vibhaktapāda Paścimottānāsana | Standing Separate Leg Stretching Pose | | Prasarita Padottanasana; Wide Stance Forward Bend |
| 9 | त्रिकोणासन; Trikoṇāsana | Triangle Pose | | Parsvakonasana; Extended Side Angle Pose |
| 10 | दण्डायमन विभक्तपाद जानुशीर्षासन; Daṇḍāyamana Vibhaktapāda Jānuśīrṣāsana | Standing Separate Leg Head To Knee Pose | | Parsvottanasana; Intense Side Stretch Pose |
| 11 | ताडासन; Tāḍāsana | Tree Pose | | Vrikshasana |
| 12 | पादाङ्गुष्ठासन; Pādāṅguṣṭhāsana | Toe Stand Pose | | Malasana |
| 13 | शवासन; Śavāsana | Corpse Pose | | Savasana |
| 14 | पवनमुक्तासन; Pavanamuktāsana | Wind Relieving Pose | | Pavanamuktasana |
| 15 | पादहस्तासन; Pādahastāsana | Situp | | Paschimottanasana; Seated Forward Bend |
| 16 | भुजङ्गासन; Bhujaṅgāsana | Cobra Pose | | Bhujangasana |
| 17 | शलभासन; Śalabhāsana | Locust Pose | | Ardha Salabhasana |
| 18 | पूर्णशलभासन; Pūrṇaśalabhāsana | Full Locust Pose | | Salabhasana |
| 19 | धनुरासन; Dhanurāsana | Bow Pose | | Dhanurasana |
| 20 | सुप्तवज्रासन; Suptavajrāsana | Reclining Thunderbolt Pose | | Supta Virasana; Reclining Hero Pose |
| 21 | अर्धकूर्मासन; Ardhakūrmāsana | Half Tortoise Pose | | Balasana; Child Pose |
| 22 | उष्ट्रासन; Uṣṭrāsana | Camel Pose | | Ustrasana |
| 23 | शसांगासना Śasāṁgāsanā | Rabbit Pose | | Balasana; Child Pose |
| 24 | जानुशीर्षासन with पश्चिमोत्तानासन; Jānuśīrṣāsana with Paścimottānāsana | Head To Knee Pose with Back Stretching Pose | | Janusirsasana |
| 25 | अर्धमत्स्येन्द्रासन; Ardha Matsyendrāsana | Half Lord of the Fishes Pose | | Ardha Matsyendrasana |
| 26 | कपालभाति Kapālabhāti | "Skull polishing" | | (not an asana: a shatkarma, a purification) |
