= Bishnu Charan Ghosh =

Indian bodybuilder and yoga practitioner (1903–1970)

- Born: 24 June 1903; Lahore, Punjab Province, British India
- Died: 9 July 1970 (aged 67); Calcutta, West Bengal, India
- Occupation: Bodybuilding
- Known for: Modern yoga
- Relatives: Paramahansa Yogananda (brother)

Bishnu Charan Ghosh (24 June 1903 – 9 July 1970) was an Indian bodybuilder and Hathayogi. He was the younger brother of yogi Paramahansa Yogananda, who wrote the 1946 book Autobiography of a Yogi. In 1923, he founded the College of Physical Education, Calcutta. His writings influenced the development of modern yoga as exercise in India and Bikram Choudhury founded Bikram Yoga based on his teachings.

Annual yoga championships in Los Angeles are named the Bishnu Charan Ghosh Cup in his honour.

== Life ==
Bishnu Charan Ghosh was born in a well to do Bengali family in Lahore, the youngest of eight children of Bhagabati Charan Ghosh (1853–1942) and brother of Mukunda Lal Ghosh, better known by his spiritual name, Paramahansa Yogananda. His parents' guru was Lahiri Mahasaya, who taught Kriya Yoga.

Yogananda introduced Ghosh to yoga at his Ranchi School for Boys in Bengal, where he was one of the first seven pupils. As well as Yogananda's set of 84 "Yogoda" asanas gathered from different sources, his brother taught him the abdominal muscle isolation exercise traditionally used in hatha yoga as the purification (shatkarma) known as nauli; Yogananda had used the exercise to impress Western audiences with his muscle control. In 1923, at the age of twenty, Ghosh opened the College of Physical Education in Calcutta, today run by his granddaughter Muktamala Ghosh under the name Ghosh's Yoga College. In 1925, he trained in physical education at the University of Calcutta, taught according to India's traditional (medieval) physical culture of training, diet, and lifestyle. The equipment consisted of rough "nal" stones with a hole for use as a handle.

In 1930, he published his book Muscle Control, which relied heavily on the German bodybuilder Maxick (Max Sick)'s 1913 book of the same name. The book features his adoptive nephew, Buddha Bose, demonstrating nauli and uddiyana bandha; Bose wrote a manuscript on 84 Asanas, not published until the 21st century.

In 1939, Ghosh went to America and taught at Columbia University, New York. In 1968, he went on a lecture tour of Japan.

== Philosophy ==
Bishnu's muscle control was strongly influenced by Yogananda's Method Yogoda, as described in his 1925 book on that subject. This "Body Perfection by Will" relied on the use of weights and special apparatus for musclebuilding. Added to this was the weaving in of traditional asanas from Hatha yoga; he became well known in India as a Hathayogi, teaching a yoga that was "a fusion of asanas, physical culture, and the muscle manipulation techniques that Ghosh had first learned from his brother".

The yoga researcher Mark Singleton has argued that Ghosh's method contributed significantly to the development of modern postural yoga. It has been stated that Ghosh also influenced the development of Sivananda Yoga's sequence of 12 basic asanas.

== Legacy ==
Ghosh's Yoga College in North Kolkata continues to offer training in therapeutic yoga in the 21st century.

Bikram Choudhury, creator of Bikram Yoga, claimed to have been taught by Ghosh from the age of five. However, he did not become a regular student at Bishnu's gymnasium until 1962 at the age of 18. At that time Bikram was a bodybuilder. His system of yoga was based on Ghosh's teachings. Choudhury named the Bishnu Charan Ghosh Cup, awarded annually at the International Yoga Asana Championships in Los Angeles, in Ghosh's honor.

== Pupils ==
- Reba Rakshit (1933–2010), who could withstand the weight of cars and elephants driven over her chest.
- Monotosh Roy (1917–2005), who in 1951 became the first Indian bodybuilder to win the title of Mr. Universe.

== Works ==
- B.C. Ghosh and K.C. Sen Gupta: Muscle Control and Barbell Exercise. College of Physical Education, Calcutta, 1930.

== Sources ==
- Singleton, Mark (2010). Yoga body : the origins of modern posture practice. Oxford University Press. ISBN 978-0-19-539534-1. OCLC 318191988.
- Maxick (1913). Muscle Control, or Body Development by Will-Power. Ewart, Seymour & Co.
- Ghosh, S. L. (1980). Mejda, the Family and Early Life of Paramahansa Yogananda. Los Angeles: Self-Realization Fellowship.
