= Agehananda Bharati =

Austrian academic (1923–1991)

Swami Agehananda Bharati (Sanskrit: अगेहानन्द भारती, romanized: Svamī Agehānanda Bhāratī; Vienna, April 20, 1923 – New York, May 14, 1991) was a professor of anthropology at Syracuse University for over 30 years. His birth name was Leopold Fischer. He was an academic Sanskritist, a writer on religious subjects, and a Hindu monk in the Dasanami Sannyasi order.

== Early life ==
Fischer was born in Vienna, Austria, on April 20, 1923, to Hans and Margarete Fischer. Growing up, he joined the Indian Club and began to study Hindi and classical Sanskrit, which led to his decision to become an Indologist. Later, Fischer became a member of Germany's Free India Legion, a military unit raised during the Second World War as part of the Waffen-SS which intended to serve as a liberation force for British-ruled India. He converted to Hinduism, taking the name Ramachandra.

== Career ==
Although he attended the University of Vienna, Bharati kept up his studies as a monk and took up teaching. He was an expert in cultural anthropology, South Asian studies, linguistics, and comparative philosophy. He taught in Delhi University, Banaras Hindu University, and Nalanda Institute in India, and in a Buddhist academy in Bangkok, where he began his teachings on comparative religion. Bharati became a visiting professor of Indian philosophy at the University of Tokyo and Kyoto.

In 1956, Bharati came to the U.S. as a research associate for University of Washington. A year later he transferred to Syracuse and joined the anthropology faculty. He settled in Syracuse and became Ford-Maxwell Professor of South Asian Studies. He became chairman of his department. He was granted U.S. citizenship in 1968. Although he lived in Syracuse he continued to travel. He visited Hawaii, Britain, Michigan, Soviet Union, Germany, and Ireland for research and as a visiting professor.

Bharati was a member of American Association of University Professors, American Anthropological Association (fellow), Association for Applied Anthropology (fellow), American Linguistic Society, International Association for General Semantics, Mensa International, Mind Association, Royal Anthropological Institute of Great Britain and Ireland, Royal Philosophical Society, Royal Siam Society, International Academy of Human Rights, and New York Academy of Sciences.

Agehananda Bharati died on May 14, 1991, of cancer, in a friend's house in Pittsford, New York.

By the time he died, Bharati had over 500 published works, including The Ochre Robe, an autobiography.

== Works ==
- The Tantric Tradition. London: Rider, 1966. Revised Edition: Red Wheel Weiser, 1975. ISBN 0877282536
- The Light at the Center: Context and Pretext of Modern Mysticism. Santa Barbara, CA: Ross-Erikson. 1976. ISBN 0-915520-04-4
- The Ochre Robe: An Autobiography. Second Revised Edition, with New Epilog. Santa Barbara, CA: Ross-Erikson, 1980. ISBN 0-915520-28-1
- Fictitious Tibet: The Origin and Persistence of Rampaism, an article published in the Tibet Society Bulletin (Bloomington, Ind.), Vol. 7, 1974
- Excerpts from The Light at the Center on LSD and zero-experiences
- "Past and Future Trends in Contemporary Hinduism" by Agehananda Bharati
