= CorePower Yoga =

American yoga studio chain

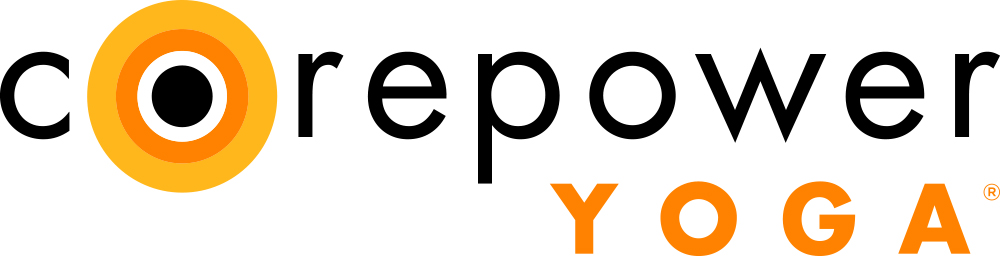
- Type: Private
- Industry: Fitness
- Founded: 2002; 24 years ago
- Founder: Trevor Tice
- Headquarters: Denver, Colorado, U.S.
- Number of locations: 220 (2024)
- Key people: CEO: Niki Leondakis (2020-current); Co-Founders: Brandon Cox, Tim Johnson, Dave Porter
- Website: www.corepoweryoga.com

CorePower Yoga, based in Denver, Colorado, is the largest yoga studio brand in the United States with more than 220 locations across 23 states. Founded in 2002, CorePower Yoga offers memberships, classes, and yoga teacher training.

== History ==
The first CorePower Yoga studio was opened in 2002 by founder Trevor Tice. Alongside early partners Dave Porter, Brandon Cox and Tim Johnson, Tice grew the company through private funding. In 2008, CorePower made its first expansion outside of Colorado opening in Minneapolis, San Diego, Portland, and Chicago. Tice was Chief Executive Officer (CEO) until CorePower Yoga received an investment from the private equity firm Catterton Partners. Tice stepped down as CEO following this deal in 2014. Following Tice's death in 2016, his successor, Eric Kufel, ran the daily operations of the company from 2017 to 2019. In 2019, CorePower Yoga was acquired by TSG Consumer Partners. Financial aspects of this deal were not disclosed. In January 2020, Niki Leondakis was appointed as CEO.

== Memberships and studio information ==
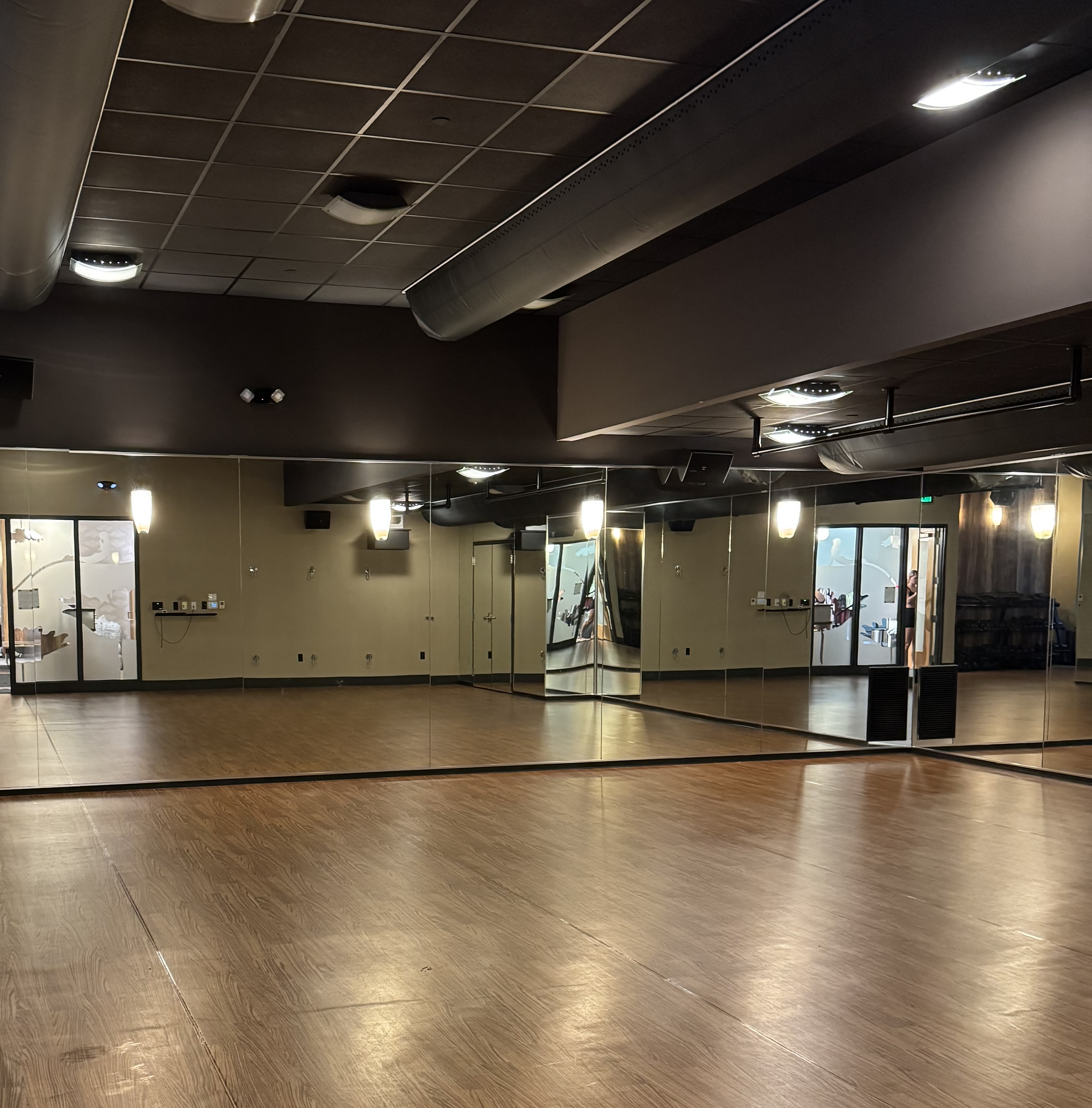
Inside of a CorePower Yoga studio.

CorePower Yoga is considered to have its own yoga class style combining power yoga, ashtanga yoga, and vinyasa flow yoga. Class styles range from their C2 class, hot yoga, and yoga sculpt class that uses weights and blends yoga with cardio and strength moves.

Since 2018, CorePower Yoga On Demand has offered subscription based online yoga classes. CorePower started offering an At Home Membership in 2020, which offers classes both pre-recorded On Demand classes and live virtual classes.

CorePower StrengthX launched in 2023, its first new offering in 10 years that combines cardio, strength and HIIT-style elements.

== Lawsuits ==
In 2017, CorePower settled a class action lawsuit for $1.65 million regarding employee compensation for extra hours of work outside of the studio — CorePower did not admit liability. In April 2019, a class action lawsuit was filed against the company by more than 2,100 employees, alleging gross underpayment of wages. This lawsuit was settled for $1.5 million — this was the fourth lawsuit around employee underpayment against the company.

== Teacher training ==
In addition to teaching classes, CorePower Yoga also offers yoga teacher training. 200 and 300-hour training programs are available in their “power vinyasa” style and 50-hour sessions in their "yoga sculpt" method — incorporating yoga poses and flow with cardio and weights.
