= Bikram Yoga =

System of yoga in a heated room

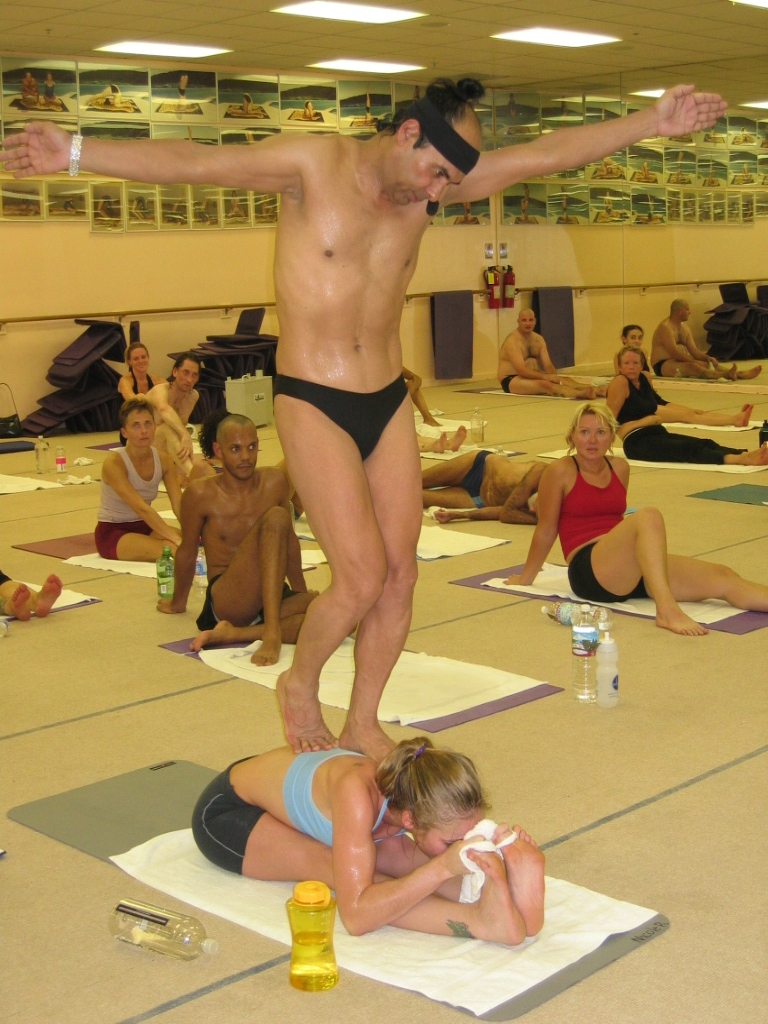
- Bikram Choudhury leading a Bikram yoga class in his own personal style
- Founder: Bikram Choudhury
- Established: 1970s

Practice emphasises
- Unchanging sequence of 26 postures in a heated room

Bikram Yoga is a system of hot yoga, a type of yoga as exercise, spread by Bikram Choudhury and based on the teachings of B. C. Ghosh, that became popular in the early 1970s. Classes consist of a fixed sequence of 26 postures, practised in a room heated to 105 °F (41 °C) with a humidity of 40%, intended to replicate the climate of India. The room is fitted with carpets and the walls are covered in mirrors. The instructor may adjust the students' yoga postures. Choudhury's teaching style was abrasive.

Bikram Yoga spread rapidly across America and the Western world, reaching a peak of some 1,650 studios in at least 40 countries in 2006. Choudhury attempted to copyright the Bikram Yoga sequence from 2011, but was ultimately unsuccessful. In 2016, facing lawsuits and accusations of sexual assault, Choudhury fled to India, leaving Bikram Yoga, Inc. to be run by others.

== Origins ==
Bikram Choudhury was born in Calcutta in 1944. He began studying yoga in 1969. He arrived in America in 1971, and soon began to teach yoga in health resorts in California. In 1974, two pupils, Shirley MacLaine and Anne Marie Bennstrom, helped him to open his own school at 9441 Wilshire Boulevard in Los Angeles. He attracted celebrity pupils including the Hollywood dancer Marge Champion and the actors Keir Dullea, Martin Sheen, Susan Sarandon, and Raquel Welch. Yoga classes were initially free, with a donation box. Maclaine told Choudhury he could not run an American yoga school like one in India, and he began to charge $5 for classes; attendance started to grow at once.

Choudhury later devised the 26-posture sequence of Bikram Yoga, based on the teachings of B. C. Ghosh.

== Style ==
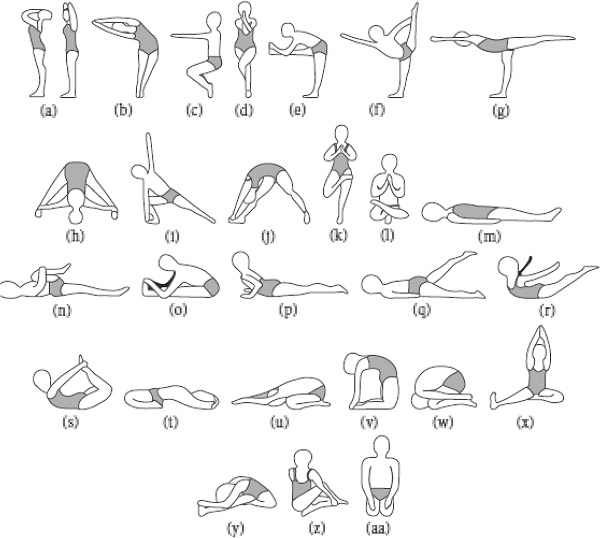
Bikram yoga sequence of asanas (poses). Standing pranayama (a), standing sequence (b–l), savasana (m), floor asanas (n–z), kapalabati (aa) and final savasana (m)

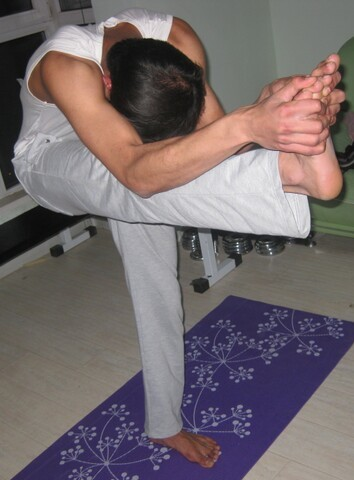
Bikram Yoga's 26 postures include some such as Dandayamana-Janushirsasana not widely used in other styles.

Bikram Yoga Beginning Series classes run for 90 minutes and always consist of 26 postures, namely a fixed sequence of 24 asanas and two pranayama (breathing exercise). It starts with a standing pranayama, followed by a standing sequence of asanas, a first savasana, floor asanas, the last pranayama named Kapalabhati which is a shatkarma (a purification), and a final savasana that ends the sequence. The room is fitted with mirrors and carpets, and the yoga postures of students may be adjusted by the teacher, who can also adjust themselves using the mirrors.

The hot yoga style is practised in a room heated to 105 °F (41 °C) with a humidity of 40%, intended to replicate the climate of India where it was created. Bikram Yoga trains its own teachers. They are taught a standardized dialogue to run the class, but are encouraged to develop their own delivery style.

The author Brigid Delaney described seeing Choudhury in his first yoga studio in Australia, and was "shocked" by the environment and by Choudhury's bragging and abrasive manner; she noted also the docility of his students and the "fawning" atmosphere, writing:

What the hell was this practice? The yoga took place in a room heated to around 41C. It was packed and it stunk. There were mirrors everywhere and the room was carpeted, which absorbed the stench and the sweat."

== Growth ==
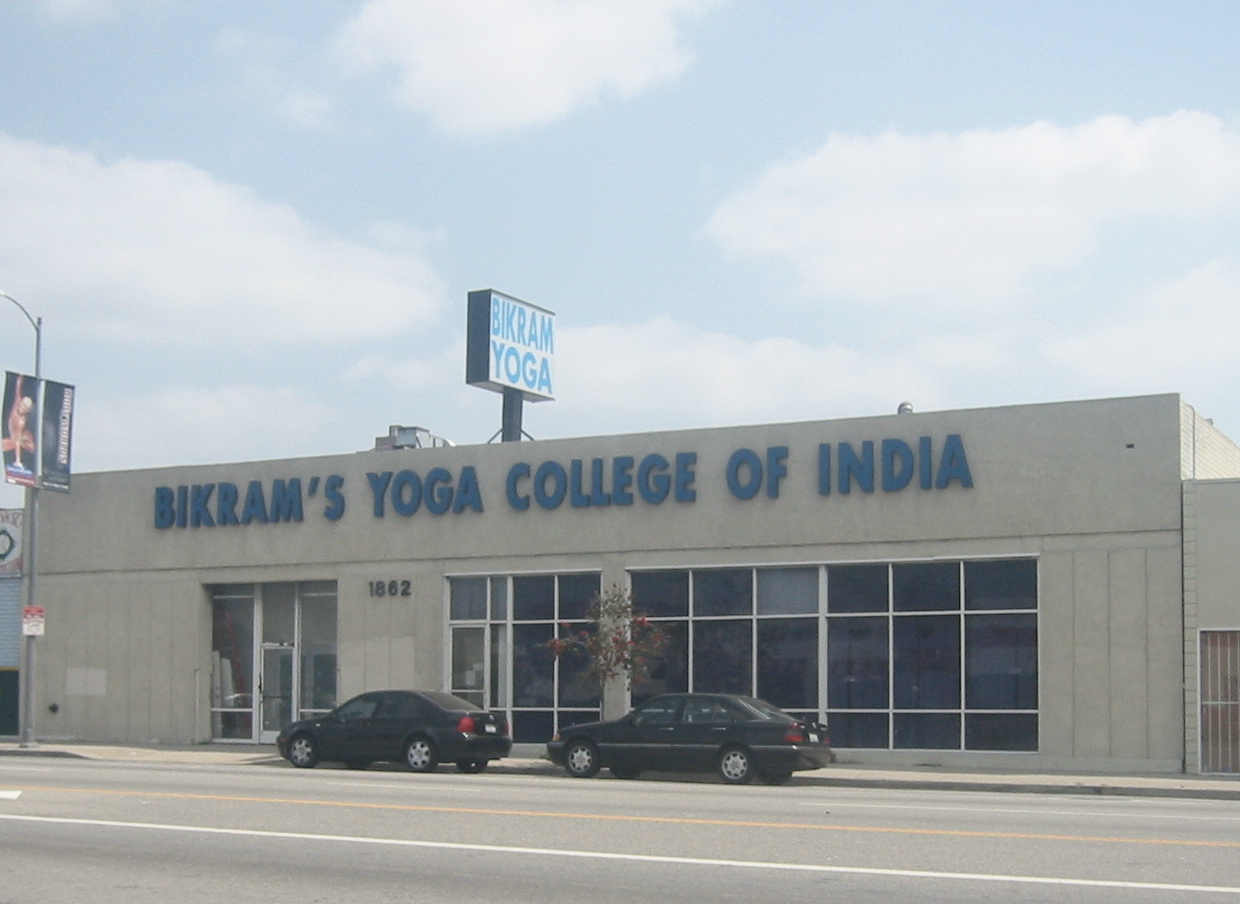
Bikram's Yoga College of India on La Cienega Boulevard in Los Angeles, California

Choudhury was extremely charismatic and persuasive, and this contributed to his success according to principal Bikram teacher Emmy Cleaves. He also had a philosophy of making pupils work through pain, and a "highly entertaining in-class patter," being happy to tell pupils "I am a butcher and I try to kill you ... but don't worry, yoga is the best death." By 1984, classes were priced at $20 (about $50 in 2019 terms). That year, sports journalist Jack McCallum watched a class respond to Choudhury's verbal abuse "like eager cadets." Practice was so intense that it demanded "an entire identity" based on commitment to hard work, a regular yoga schedule, and verbal castigation. In short, "a complete religion of bodily purification" rewarded by "a feeling of pure energy." The franchise grew rapidly and spread to other countries. By 2006, there were 1,650 Bikram Yoga studios around the world, The franchise then declined somewhat, and by 2012, there were 330 studios in the United States and 600 worldwide. with studios in two countries in Africa, seven countries in the Americas (including in 39 US states), eleven countries in Asia and the Middle East, eighteen countries in Europe, and two in Australasia.

== Adverse health effects ==
A 2013 review of 76 yoga-related adverse events included 3 in Bikram Yoga. The three case reports consisted of one case of rosacea, one psychotic episode, and one of hyponatremia (low salt level).

== Copyright claims ==
Choudhury claimed, starting in 2011, that Bikram Yoga was under copyright and that it could not be taught or presented by anyone whom he had not authorized. In that year, Choudhury started a lawsuit against Yoga to the People, a competing yoga studio founded by a former student of Choudhury's and with a location near one of the Bikram Yoga studios in New York, and later started another against the Florida-based Evolation Yoga.

In the case Bikram's Yoga College of India v. Evolation Yoga, filed in 2011, Choudhury claimed exclusive copyright over his sequence of 26 yoga poses and two breathing exercises. The U.S. District Court initially ruled against Choudhury in December 2012, finding that the yoga sequence constituted "a collection of facts and ideas" not entitled to copyright protection.

When Choudhury appealed, the U.S. Court of Appeals for the Ninth Circuit unanimously affirmed the lower court's decision in October 2015. Writing for the court, Judge Kim McLane Wardlaw explained that "copyright protects only the expression of this idea — the words and pictures used to describe the Sequence — and not the idea of the Sequence itself." The appellate court found that Choudhury's yoga sequence constituted an uncopyrightable "system" or "method" designed to yield physical benefits, falling under copyright law's exclusion of ideas, processes, and systems from protection.

As a result of these lawsuits, the United States Copyright Office issued a clarification that yoga postures (asanas) could not be copyrighted in the way claimed by Choudhury, and that other studios could continue to freely teach these exercises.

== Sexual abuse by Choudhury ==
Choudhury has faced multiple lawsuits alleging sexual harassment, assault, racism and homophobia. In 2016 he fled to India, where he continued to teach yoga. His former lawyer, Minakshi Jafa-Bodden, took over the running of Bikram, Inc. in America, after she successfully sued Choudhury for $7M in damages and he fled the country to avoid payment.

The accusations against Choudhury were the subject of a 2019 Netflix true crime documentary, Bikram: Yogi, Guru, Predator. The documentary also gave an exploration of Choudhury's early life in India, mostly told by Choudhury himself, in juxtaposition with the allegations and testimonies of various women who claim to have been assaulted and bullied by him. They argue that Choudhury was a charismatic but abusive and rude narcissist who took pleasure in mocking the physical appearances of his students, while holding financial and emotional power over many of them. Bikram: Yogi, Guru, Predator has since been challenged by Choudhury's lawyer.
