= Yogendra (name) =

Yogendra is an Indian given name and surname. Notable people with the name include:

== Given name ==
- Yogendra Chowdhury (1934–1994), Indian cricketer
- Yogendra Dimri, Indian general officer
- Yogendra Duraiswamy (1923–1999), Sri Lankan diplomat
- Yogendra Dutt, Fijian football manager
- Yogendra Gupta, Indian-American physicist
- Yogendra Jha (born 1931), Indian politician
- Yogendra Kumar Joshi, electrical engineer
- Yogendra Makwana (born 1933), Indian politician
- Yogendra Mandal, Nepalese politician
- Yogendra Narain (born 1942), Indian politician
- Yogendra Nath Baitha, Indian politician
- Yogendra Puranik (born 1977), Indian-born Japanese politician
- Yogendra Rae Yadav, Nepalese politician
- Yogendra Rastogi (died 2015), Indian painter
- Yogendra Sao, Indian politician
- Yogendra Sharma (1915–1990), Indian politician
- Yogendra Shukla (1896–1960), Indian nationalist and freedom fighter
- Yogendra Singh (1932–2020), Indian sociologist
- Yogendra Singh (politician) (born 1972), Indian politician
- Yogendra Singh Yadav (born 1980), Indian soldier and recipient of the Param Vir Chakra
- Yogendra Tikku, Indian actor
- Y. P. Trivedi (born 1929), Indian politician
- Yogendra Upadhyaya (born 19e55), Indian politician
- Yogendra Vidyabhushan (1845–1904), Indian Bengali scholar, journalist and author
- Yogendra Vyas (1940–2021), Indian writer and linguist
- Yogendra Yadav (born 1963), Indian activist, psephologist and politician

== Surname ==
- Baba Yogendra (1924–2022), Indian artist and political activist
- Hansa Yogendra (born 1947), Indian yoga guru, author, researcher and television personality
- Jayadeva Yogendra (1929–2018), Indian yoga guru, researcher, author and educator
- Shri Yogendra (1897–1989), Indian yoga guru, author, poet and researcher
