= J. Clement Vaz =

Indian author and yogi (1915–2006)

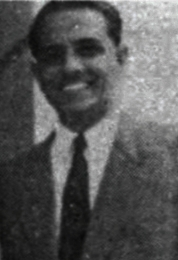
- Vaz at Teen Murti Bhavan in 1959
- Born: c. 1915; Goa, Portuguese India
- Died: 2006 (aged 90–91); Santacruz, Maharashtra, India
- Education: University of Bombay (Ph.D)
- Occupation: Writer
- Spouse: Maria Vaz
- Children: 1
- Writing career
- Language: English
- Period: 1971–1997
- Subjects: Goans; Yoga; Christians
- Notable works: Yoga Today (1971); Profiles of Eminent Goans, Past and Present (1997)

J. Clement Vaz (c. 1915 – c. 2006) was an Indian writer, best known for publications like Yoga Today (1971) and Profiles of Eminent Goans, Past and Present (1997). He served as the secretary of the Bombay Chapter of World Conference of Religions and Peace at New Delhi and New York City. He was the director in Oriental Methods of Meditation at the Centre for Indian and Inter-Religious Studies (CIIS) in Rome and was also the secretary of the International Board of Yoga in Bombay.

== Personal life ==
J. Clement Vaz was born in c. 1915 in Goa, Portuguese India (now part of India). He earned his Doctor of Philosophy (Ph.D.) from University of Bombay for his thesis "Eastern Spirituality and Christian Ethics". He was also educated in classical yoga. He married Maria Correia Afonso Vaz, the couple had a son, Frederick Vaz. After moving out of Goa, Vaz settled in Santacruz, Bombay, he would however regularly visit his hometown. He died in c. 2006, aged 90–91.

== Career ==
=== Early years ===
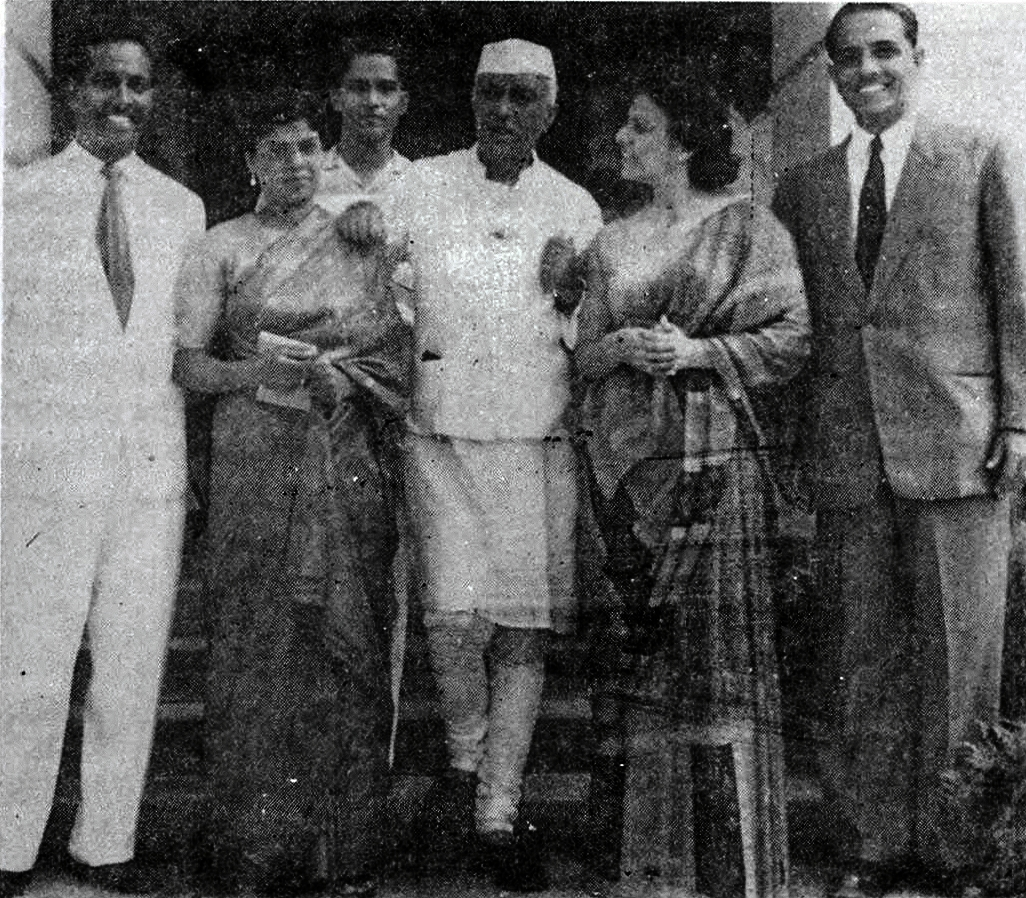
Vaz (extreme right) and a group of his friends with Jawaharlal Nehru at Teen Murti Bhavan on 7 June 1959.

Vaz moved out of Goa at the age of 18 in early 1930s to pursue his English studies at the university level. As a young college student he admired the country's foremost leaders, Mahatma Gandhi and Pandit Jawaharlal Nehru. He was one of the thousands gathered at the Belgaum Congress Session of 1924. After Mahatma Gandhi's Assassination in 1948, Vaz visited Sabarmati Ashram at Ahmedabad and Sevagram near Nagpur. He also visited Nehru when he was imprisoned by the British rulers at the fort in Ahmednagar during India's freedom struggle.

=== Writing ===
Vaz first co-authored and edited the book titled "Yoga Today" with Dr. Jayadeva Yogendra of The Yoga Institute that was published in 1971. His next book was an adaption of classical yoga to christian spirituality titled "Maranatha Oriental Methods of Prayer and Meditation" which was first issued in 1990 by St. Pauls, Bandra, Bombay, and later in August 1994 by St. Pauls, Homebush, New South Wales, Australia. Three years later he published "Profiles of Eminent Goans, Past and Present" in 1997, a reprint version was released posthumously in the year 2016.

Vaz was also featured in a number of publications like Role of Religions in National Integration (1984), Your Health (1973), Dilip (1977), Religions and Man (1981), and Journal of Dharma (1982).

=== Religious work ===
Over the years Vaz conducted various courses in India, Italy, Germany and Portugal to showcase "conscious controlled breathing with a righteous inspiration can lead to a close affinity with God". For a period of ten years, from 1975 to 1985, he was involved in encouraging inter-religious understanding in Bombay and somewhere else in assistance with Rev. Aelred Pereira S.J. and Rev. Albert Nambiaparambil C.M.I.

=== Other substantial work ===
Vaz served as the Secretary of the 'Bombay Chapter of World Conference of Religions and Peace' at its national head office in New Delhi, and the international main office in New York City. He was also the Director in Oriental Methods of Meditation at the 'Centre for Indian and Inter-Religious Studies' (CIIS) in Rome. He then served as the President of 'Satsangam', a society loyal to preservation of moral and spiritual values amongst the Indian youth, and lastly as the Secretary of 'International Board of Yoga' and 'Friends of Yoga Society' at Bombay. In 1982, Vaz introduced Yoga to Pope John Paul II at Rome during his visit at the International Seminar on Drugs at L'Aquila.

=== Post-retirement ===
Around the late 1990s Vaz was accompanied by Professor Giuseppe De Gennaro S.J., an Italian mysticist, with his unique concept of "University of Prayer" with his intense faith in God that he had been endeavouring to spread globally and had already had travelled from its place of origin at L'Aquila in Italy, Rome, Naples, Florence, Spain, U.S.A. and Russia.

== Bibliography ==
- Yoga Today (1971)
- Your Health (1973)
- Dilip (1977)
- Religions and Man (1981)
- Journal of Dharma (1982)
- Role of Religions in National Integration (1984)
- Maranatha: Oriental Methods of Prayer and Meditation (1990)
- Profiles of Eminent Goans, Past and Present (1997)
