= Barkha Sharma =

Indian fashion designer

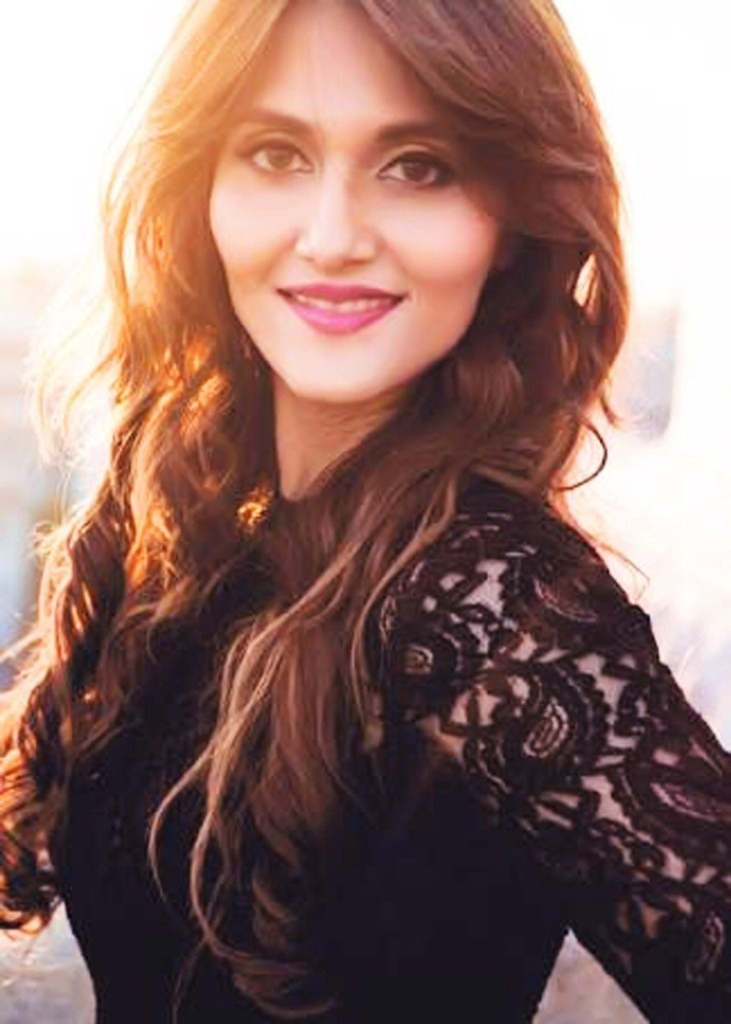
- Born: Mumbai, India
- Education: Purdue University, United States
- Occupations: Designer, author, classical dancer
- Spouse: Rahul Sharma
- Awards: Nominated for International Woolmark Prize, 2014–15
- Website: barkhansonzal.com

Barkha Sharma is an Indian fashion designer, classical dancer, author, and co-founder of the men's clothing label Barkha 'n' Sonzal. In 2014, she was nominated to represent India in the International Woolmark Prize in the menswear category. Barkha, under the label Rhydhun, also designs handicrafts. She is a trained dancer and tanpura player who was invited to perform with her husband Rahul Sharma for Prince William and Kate Middleton at the Hyderabad House, in the presence of the Prime Minister of India Narendra Modi in April 2016. Barkha is the author of “Global Little Yogis,” a book about making yoga and wellness a regular part of one's routine.

== Career ==
=== Fashion Design ===
In 2009, Barkha and her sister founded their fashion label, "Dance of the Warrior," with a men's collection. They styled Pandit Shivkumar Sharma and Rahul Sharma for the song "Mile Sur Mera Tumhara" in 2010. The sister duo has designed – The Yogi, Rebel, Spirituale, Wah Taj Tea Ad, and Tata Ad shot in Kashmir. She designed the album cover for Rahul Sharma's Namaste India, as well as the music video "Meeting by the Nile." Barkha's label is the first to design a sherwani made of string beans, purple cabbage, and green peas for PETA India. Barkha has worked with numerous tribes in India, South Africa, Europe, Egypt, Russia, etc. She volunteered for numerous NGOs, one of them being Aseema for which she made jackets for the winners of the rickshaw challenge in 2009, the benefits of which were donated to charity.

=== Music & Art ===
Barkha has lent her voice to Rahul Sharma's album "Spirituale," reciting Rumi's poems. She appeared as a model alongside her husband in Richard Clayderman's music video from the album Confluence 2. Barkha and her sister conceptualized a fashion film starring Terrence Lewis, which was selected for the Fashion Films Premiere at Lakmé Fashion Week Winter/ Festive 2013. Barkha performed tanpura with her husband Rahul Sharma for President of India Ram Nath Kovind, Chief Minister of Maharashtra Devendra Fadnavis, Governor of Maharastra C. Vidyasagar Rao and Hansa Yogendra to commemorate the Yoga Institute's 100th anniversary. Barkha performed for Yoga International Day to the song "Yug O' Vision," composed by Rahul Sharma and sung by Siddharth Basrur, under the guidance of Hansa Yogendra, director of The Yoga Institute. Padmabhushan Padma Subrahmanyam choreographed it.

=== Writer ===
Barkha Sharma is a globally celebrated author for children’s books on yoga, called 'Global Little Yogis', published by Rupa Publications. The aim of the book is promoting mindful and holistic living for greater happiness, as opposed to solely seeking material and commercial gratification. Cricketer Sachin Tendulkar wrote about the book, "A fun yoga book for children that guides them towards positivity, harmony and dynamic self-development. This has something for everyone." Actress Juhi Chawla noted that the book is "a delightful gift for every little child and young parent for living a healthy, fun, and successful life!"

Global Little Yogis, a children’s wellness book by Barkha Sharma, was unveiled at the United Nations Headquarters in New York City by India’s Permanent Representative, Ambassador Ruchira Kamboj. Showcasing the perceived power of ancient yogic techniques, the book reimagines them as a new and accessible guide for aspiring yogis. Global Little Yogis was gifted to the heads of state of all 194 UN member nations, marking a moment of cultural diplomacy and placing a spotlight on Indian culture.

== Personal life ==
Barkha Sharma was born and brought up in Mumbai and later moved to the United States. She graduated with a B.Sc. degree from Purdue University and underwent a marketing program at The Wharton Business School, followed by an entrepreneurship program at Harvard University. Barkha's father is a Gujarati and her mother hails from the Kashmiri Pandit origin. She is married to Rahul Sharma and they have a son, Abhinav Rahul Sharma, who was born in June 2014. Barkha is also a classical dancer trained in Mohiniattam and other dance forms. She studied Kalaripayattu at CVN Kalari.
