= Prabodh Pandit =

Indian linguist

- Born: Prabodh Bechardas Pandit; 23 June 1923; Vala, Bhavnagar district, Gujarat
- Died: 28 November 1975 (aged 52)
- Education: Master of Arts; PhD
- Alma mater: Bharatiya Vidya Bhavan; School of Oriental and African Studies
- Occupation: Linguist
- Writing career
- Language: Gujarati
- Notable work: Gujarati Bhashanun Dhvaniswarup ane Dhvani-Parivartan (1966)
- Notable awards: Sahitya Akademi Award (1967); Ranjitram Suvarna Chandrak (1973)

Academic work
- Doctoral students: Yogendra Vyas

Signature
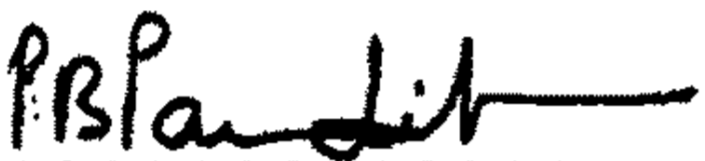

Prabodh Bechardas Pandit (23 June 1923 – 28 November 1975) was an Indian linguist from Gujarat, India. He published a total of ten books in the Gujarati language, along with many research papers published in various journals. In 1967, he received the Sahitya Akademi Award, and in 1973, the Ranjitram Suvarna Chandrak, for his contribution to the study of Gujarati language and linguistics.

== Biography ==
Pandit was born on 23 June 1923, in Vala, a village in the Bhavnagar district of Gujarat. He studied at various institutions, including Pritamnagar municipal school of Ahmedabad and Amreli. He matriculated in 1939 from the Navchetan High School, Ahmedabad. He initially missed out on graduate studies due to participating in the Indian independence movement of 1942, which led to him being jailed for six months. He later completed his Bachelor of Arts in 1944 in the Sanskrit and Ardhamagadhi languages, then attained his Master of Arts at Bharatiya Vidya Bhavan in 1946 in Sanskrit and Linguistics. Later, he went to London and joined the School of Oriental and African Studies, where he worked under the guidance of linguist Ralph Lilley Turner for his doctorate. There, he obtained his Ph.D. in 1950 for his research on Shadavashyak-balavabodhvritti. His interest in linguistics brought him into contact with Jules Bloch, who inspired him to study various Indian dialects.

After returning to India, Pandit joined the L.D. Arts College, Ahmedabad, as a lecturer in Sanskrit. In 1957, he transferred to the Gujarat University as a Reader in the Linguistics department. From 1964 to 1965 he taught at the Deccan College, Pune. In 1967, he went to Delhi and joined Delhi University as a lecturer of Linguistics where he remained until 1975. During this time he taught as a visiting lecturer at several academic institutions including the Michigan, Nairobi, Berkeley, and Cornell's respective universities.

== Works ==
Pandit is considered to be one of the pioneers in Gujarati linguistics and sociolinguistic studies in India.

He published a total of ten books in the Gujarati language along with many research papers published in various journals. His most significant works are Prakrit Bhasha (1954), (/ɛ/) and (/ɔ/) in Gujarati (1955), Nasalization, Aspiration and Murmur in Gujarati (1957), Historical Phonology of Gujarati Vowels (1961), Borrowing: A Study of Linguistic Expression of Social Distance (1961), Gujarati Bhashanun Dhvaniswarup ane Dhvani-Parivartan (1966), Phonemic and Morphemic Frequencies of the Gujarati Language (1968), Some Observations Studies in Speech Analysis (1971) and Language in Plural Society (1976).

Prabodh Pandit also wrote a book on India, India as a sociolinguistic area.

== Awards ==
His book Gujarati Bhashanun Dhvaniswarup ane Dhvani-Parivartan received the Sahitya Akademi Award in 1967. He also received Ranjitram Suvarna Chandrak in 1973 for his contribution to the study of Gujarati language and linguistics.

== See also ==
- List of Gujarati-language writers
