= The Yoga Institute =

Non-profit yoga center

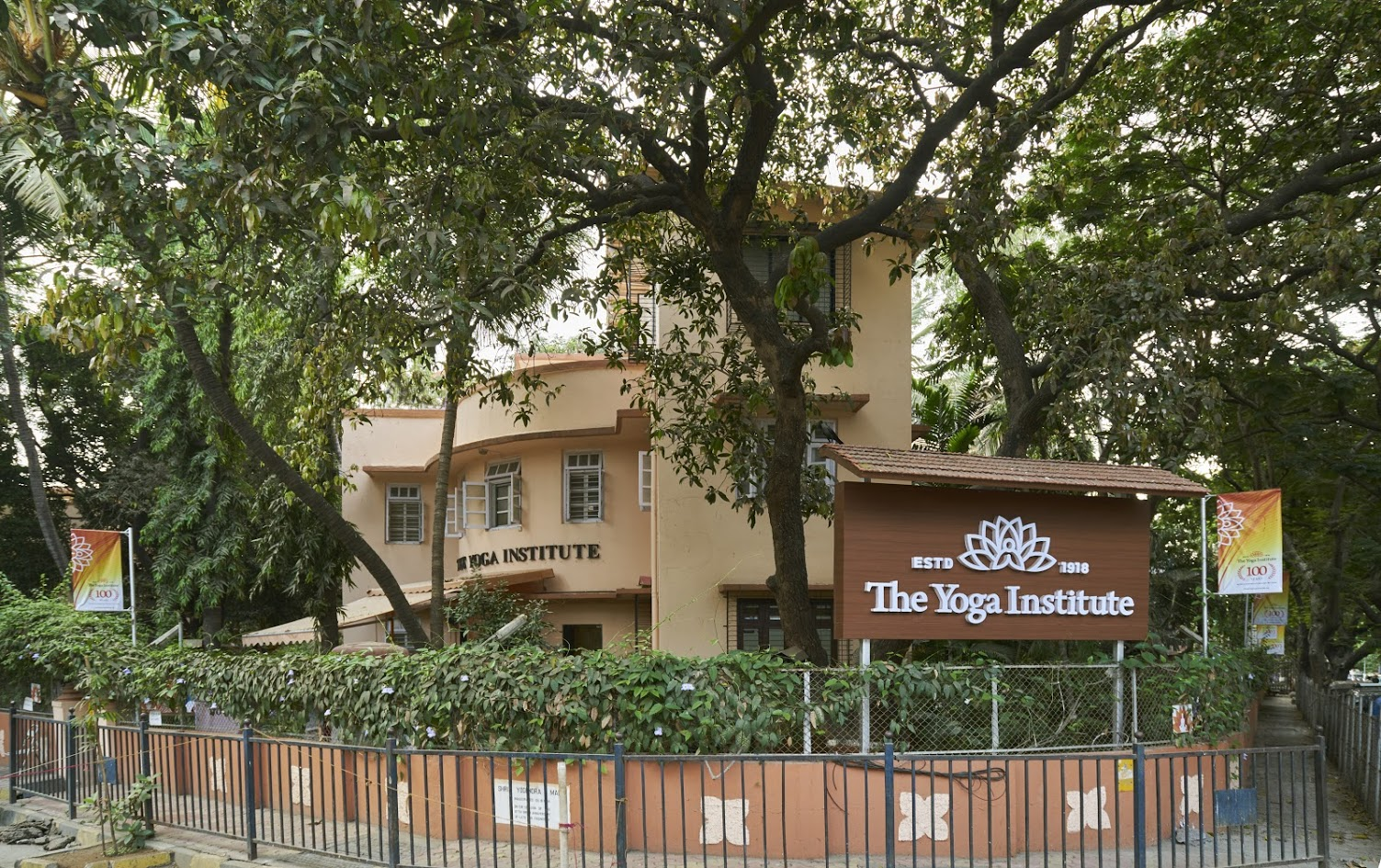
- Abbreviation: TYI
- Founded: 1918; 108 years ago
- Founder: Shri Yogendra
- Type: Charitable trust
- Purpose: Yoga, Social upliftment
- Location: Santacruz, Mumbai 19.085104°N 72.843153°E
- Region served: India, Australia, Brazil, Canada, Finland, France, Italy, Japan, South America, Switzerland, Yugoslavia and UK
- Method: Yoga programs, Meditation
- Key people: Hansa Yogendra Director; Hrishi Yogendra Asst. Director
- Website: theyogainstitute.org

The Yoga Institute (abbreviated as TYI) is a government recognized non-profit organisation, known as the oldest organized yoga center in the world. It was founded in 1918 by Shri Yogendra (1897-1989), who was one of the important figures in the modern revival of yoga. It is headquartered in Santacruz, Mumbai, India.

The Yoga Institute is certified by the Ministry of AYUSH, Government of India as the first authorized Yoga School to conduct government certified courses. It won the Prime Minister's Award 2018 by the Ministry of AYUSH for outstanding contribution in the field of Yoga in June 2018.

The institute is run by Dr. Hansa Yogendra, who also serves as President of The International Board of Yoga. Hansa was appointed as Special Executive Officer by the Government of Maharashtra on 20 June 2011.

== History ==
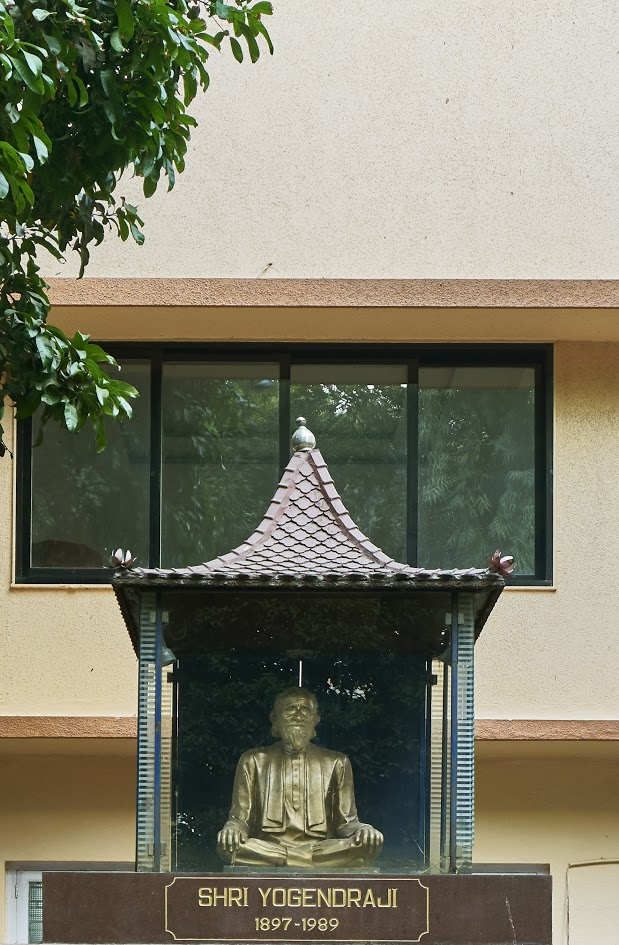
Statue of Shri Yogendra at The Yoga Institute

The Yoga Institute was founded in 1918 by Shri Yogendra at The Sands, the residence of Dadabhai Naoroji, at Versova beach near Bombay. It was the first yoga center to offer courses for free to men, women and children of any caste or creed.

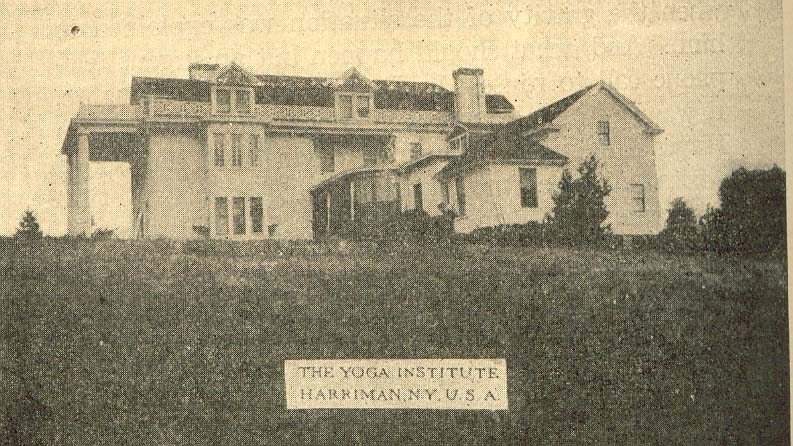
The Yoga Institute in Harriman, New York in 1920

In 1919, Shri Yogendra set off for America to found The Yoga Institute of America on Bear Mountain, New York. Until his marriage in 1927, Yogendra toured the world, teaching yoga.

The first journal of The Yoga Institute, YOGA was published in 1933. The journal has been renamed Yoga & Total Health. In 1940, publications of the Institute were microfilmed and preserved in the Crypt of Civilization to be read 6000 years later at Oglethorpe University, Georgia.

The Yoga Institute found a permanent base in Santacruz in 1948. In 1951 the Government of India prepared its first cultural documentary film on yoga under its supervision.

In 1957, the Central Government requested the institute to conduct a survey of yoga in India.

Yoga Institute launched the Medical Research Unit for research on psychosomatic and psychiatric diseases in 1970 with aid from the Central Council for Research in Indian Medicine and Homeopathy (now part of the Ministry of AYUSH). Yoga Institute Centers were established in Australia, Brazil, Canada, Finland, France, Italy, Japan, South America, Switzerland, Yugoslavia, and the UK.

The Yoga Institute hosted the World Householder's Yoga Conference in 1997 which was presided over by the Dalai Lama.

In December, 2008, the institute launched a first-of-its kind yoga museum in Mumbai, based on classical yoga, displaying its rich 5000 year old heritage through paintings, literature, copies of ancient letters and old equipment's.

The Yoga Institute completed its 99th year on 25 December 2017. The inaugural ceremony of the centenary celebrations of institute was attended by Venkaiah Naidu, the Vice President of India and C. Vidyasagar Rao, the Governor of Maharashtra.

== Research ==
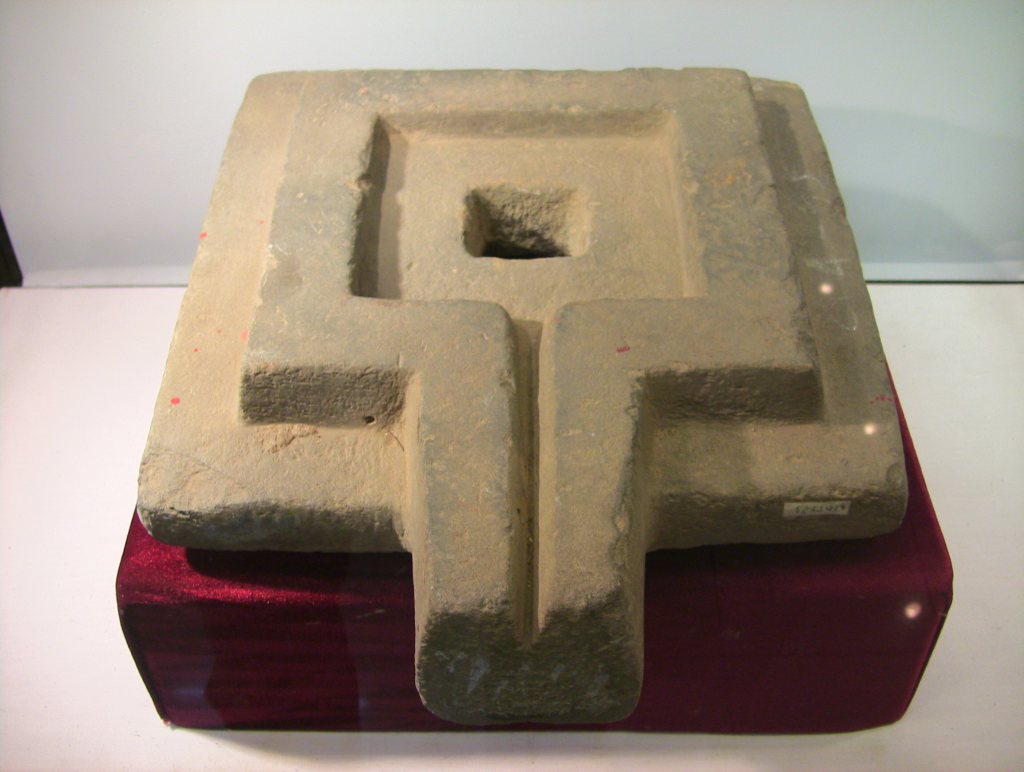
The Yoga Institute conducted first scientific research on the effect of Yoni mudra in 1951.

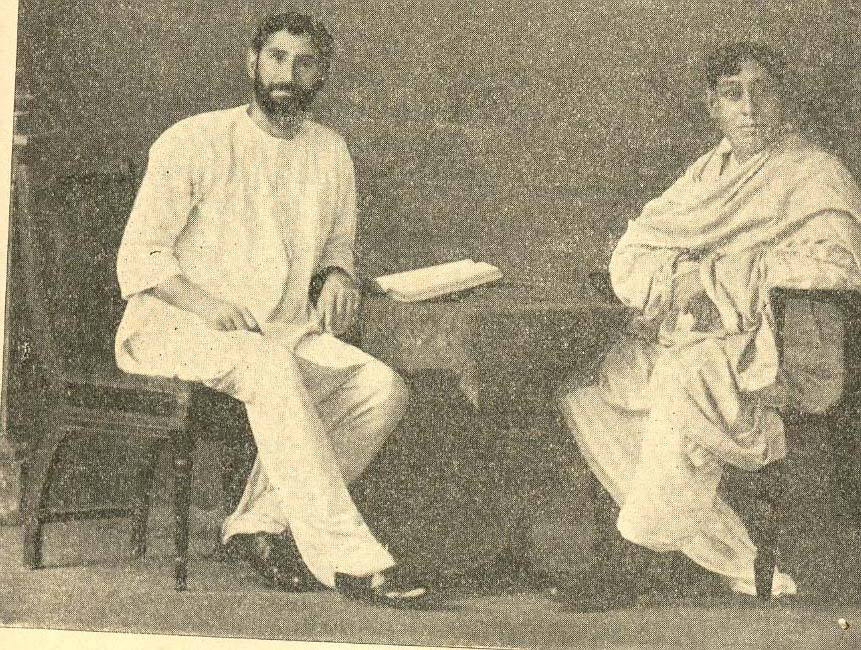
Shri Yogendra with Dr. Surendranath Dasgupta in 1924

The Yoga Institute is one of the Indian government recognized research institute. In 1924, first research on Prana was conducted by founder Yogendra with Surendranath Dasgupta, an orientalist and a scholar of Sanskrit and philosophy. In 1951, Harvard scientists and UNESCO experts, Dr. Theresa Browne and Dr. JB Millovanovich came to The Yoga Institute to conduct research on the effects of Yoni mudra.

The institute also conduced research work like X ray research on Khecarī mudrā and X Ray studies on Sutra neti kriyas. It received Rs. 35 Lakh from the Union Ministry of Health and Family Welfare to conduct research on how Yoga can help parents and students cope with exam stress.

In 2004, a research project of Caring Heart on Reversal of Heart Disease was launched by the institute to prove the medical world that the heart disease could be treated through yogic lifestyle leading to reversal in coronary artery disease.

The Yoga Institute conducted a study published in The Journal of the Association of Physicians of India (JAPI), which establishes the reversibility of heart disease through Yoga based lifestyle.

== The Yogendra family ==
The Yoga Institute's founder, Yogendra is one of the figures responsible for simplifying yoga asanas and bringing yogic technologies to the common householder. He was known to be a lover of poetry and a proponent of eugenics, the "applied science or the bio-social movement which advocates the use of practices aimed at improving the genetic composition of a population", usually referring to human populations. He propagated yoga as a means to encourage conscious evolution. The founder's wife, Sita Devi was a proponent of Yoga and worked toward promoting yoga among women.

Shri Yogendra had two sons, Jayadeva and Vijayadev. Viyayadev travelled to Australia in 1964 and established The Yoga Education Centre with his wife, Jill Campbell, in Melbourne. Vijayadev's work as a Yoga teacher, educationalist and author had a significant positive impact in Australia until his death in 2005.

His eldest son, Dr. Jayadeva Yogendra, (M.A., PhD.) took up the Directorship of The Yoga Institute, Santacruz in 1985 and served as the president of institute until his death in February 2018. His wife, Hansa, is the present Director of the institute.

== Activities ==
This institute conducts a number of workshops and organizes therapeutic health camps. It offers courses for learners. The Yoga Institute is also engaged in various philanthropic activities and has adopted 10 BMC schools. It organizes camps for juvenile homes, women's shelters and even for the Mumbai Police. It also conducts free yoga sessions for students as well as the teachers in BMC schools.

The institute organizes training programmes for educational institutions, members of the Police force, employees of the All India Radio and Television Centre and for the NCC organization, as reported in Maharashtra State Gazetteers in 1986.

In 2009, The Institute trained teachers from states of Gujarat, Punjab, Rajasthan, Jammu and Kashmir and Himachal Pradesh for one month Yoga Teacher's Training Program under the National School Teachers Project, sponsored by MDNIY, Ministry of Health (India).

In December 2018, The Yoga Institute organized a two days Yoga festival attended by Ramnath Kovind, the President of India, to celebrate its 100th anniversary.

The Institute assisted the University of Mumbai and National Council of Educational Research and Training in drafting the syllabus for the yoga course. It is credited for over 500 published works and numerous scientific studies. The institute has partnered with Google Arts & Culture to provide its 400 archival images and artifacts online.

== Recognition ==
In 1958, The Central Government of India recognized The Yoga Institute as a special training institute of Yoga and research.

In 2016, the institute was certified as the first authorized Yoga School to conduct government certified courses by Ministry of AYUSH, Government of India.

In 2018, The Yoga Institute received the Prime Minister's Award for outstanding contribution for promotion and development of Yoga by the Ministry of AYUSH, Government of India.

== Gallery ==
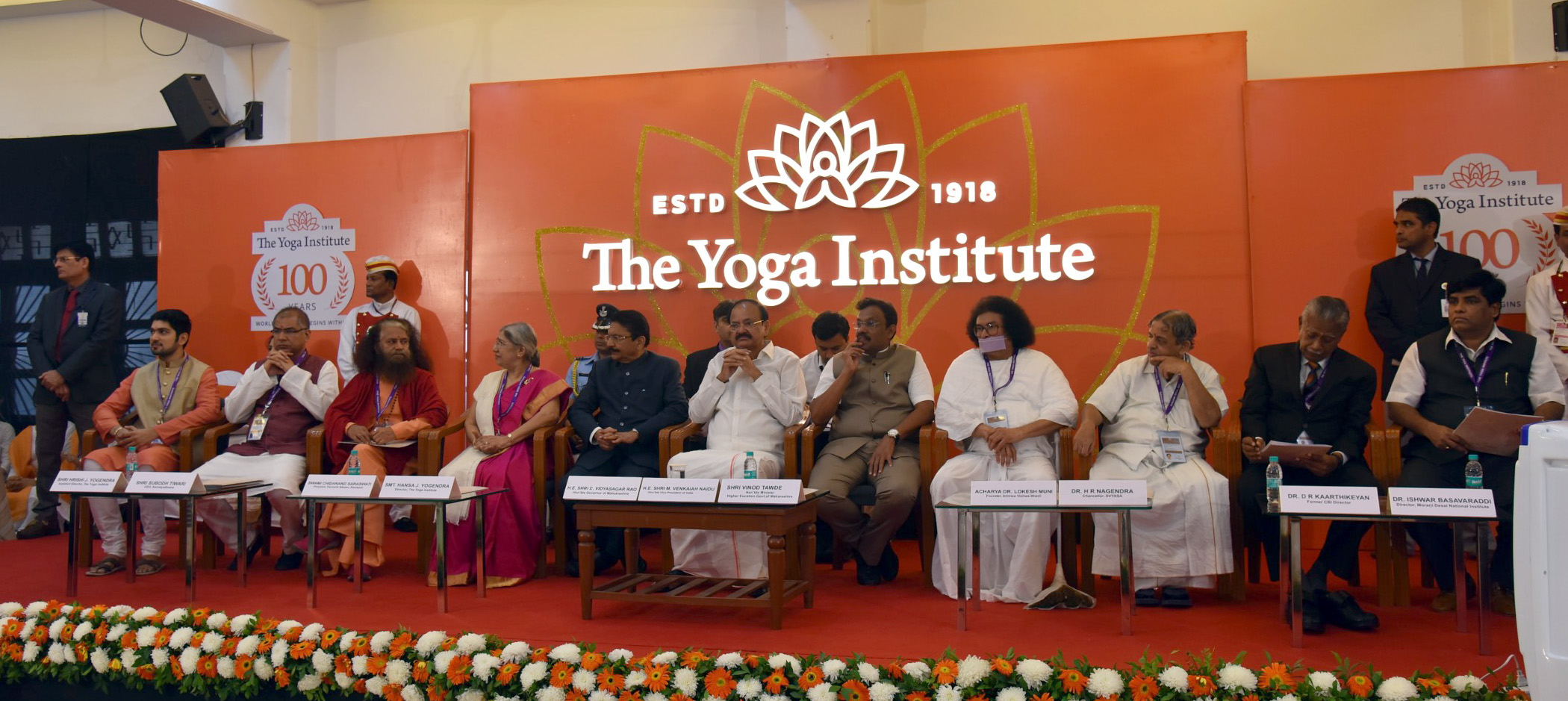

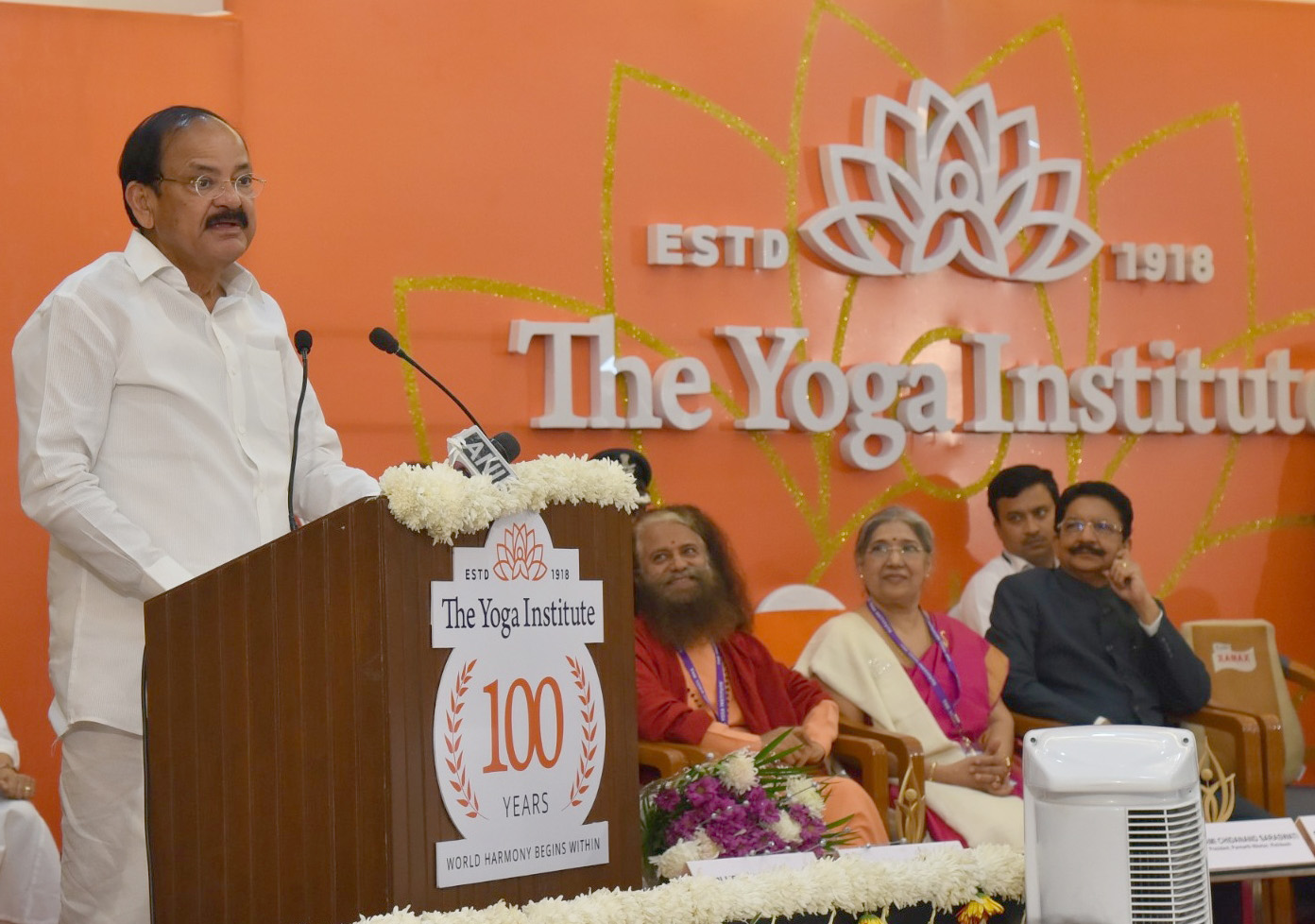

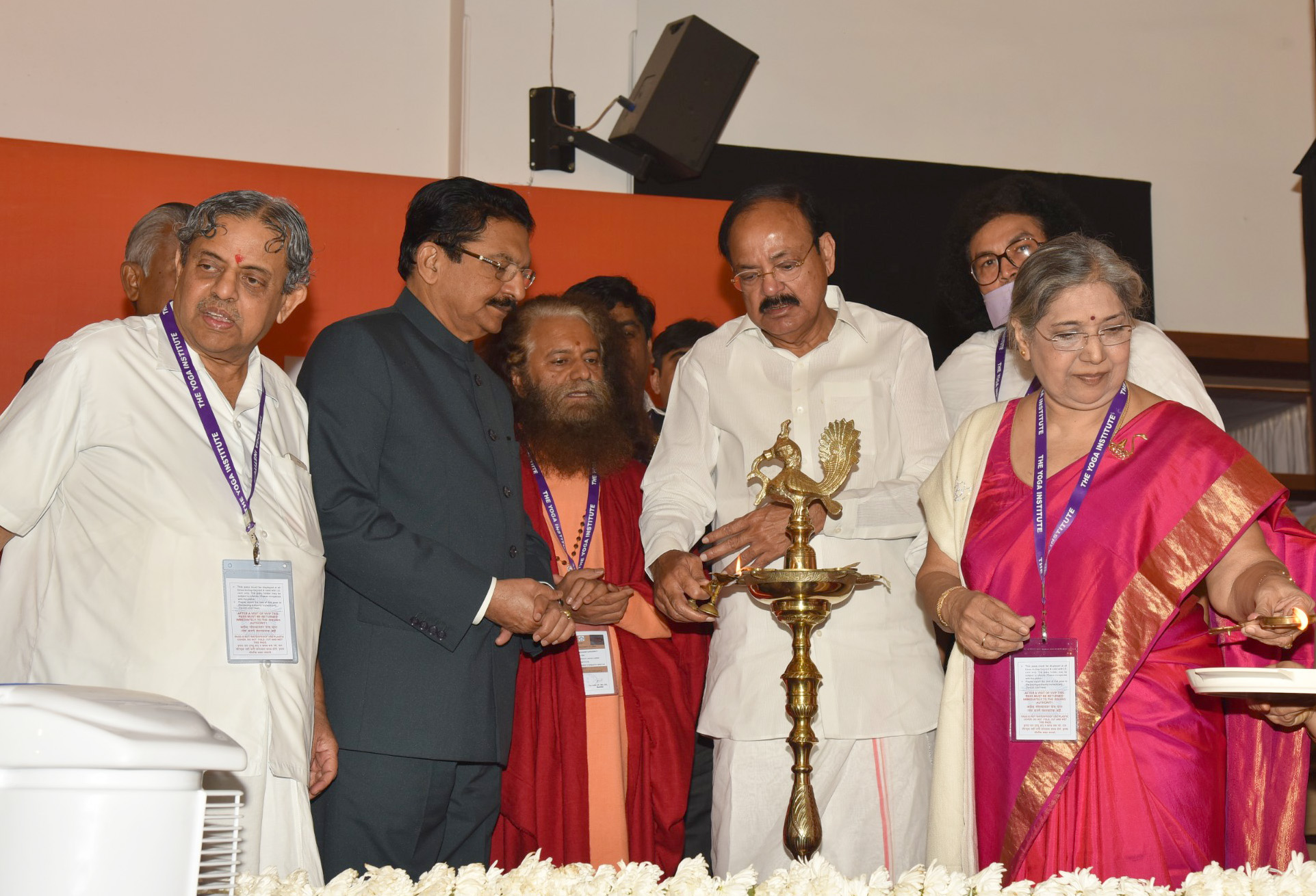
