= Rahul Sharma (musician) =

Indian musician and composer (born 1972)

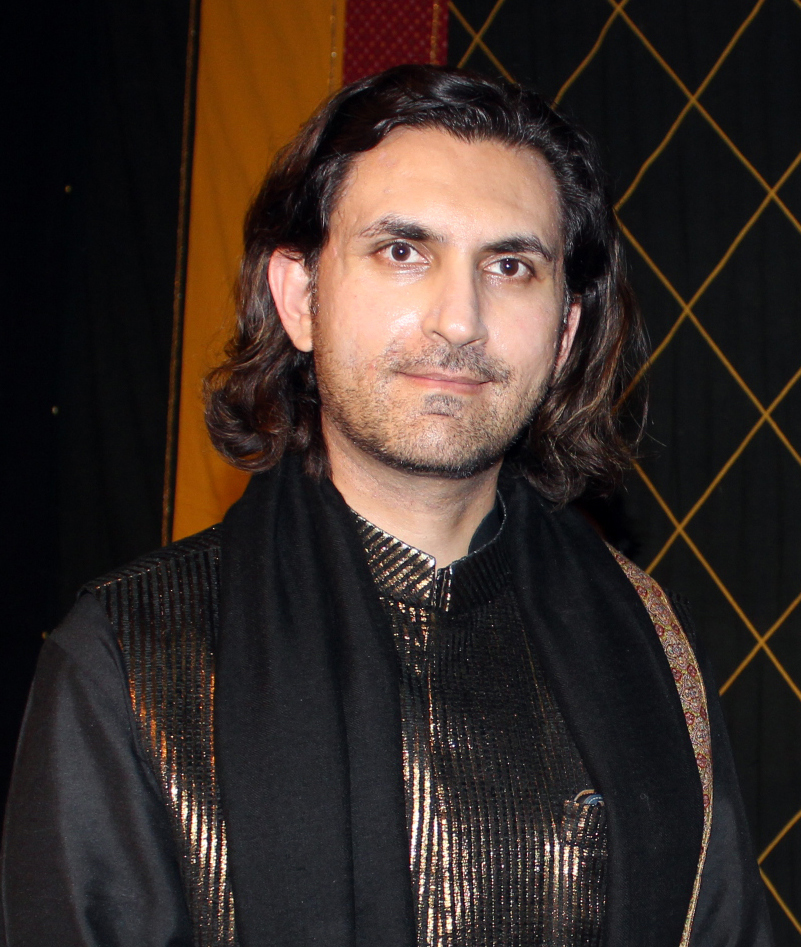
- Sharma in 2016

Background information
- Born: 25 September 1972 (age 53); Mumbai, Maharashtra, India
- Genres: Indian classical music
- Occupations: Musician; composer
- Instrument: Santoor
- Years active: 1996–present
- Website: rahulsantoor.com

Rahul Sharma (born 25 September 1972) is an Indian classical santoor player and composer. He has released numerous albums throughout his career, several of which have been collaborations with prominent artists such as his father, Shivkumar Sharma; Richard Clayderman; Deep Forest; and Kenny G.

== Early life and studies ==
Rahul Sharma was born in Mumbai into the Dogra family of santoor player Shivkumar Sharma. He took up the harmonium while still young, and he began learning to play the santoor from his father at the age of 13. Sharma later studied at Mumbai's Mithibai College. He went on to perform with his father numerous times, and the two even recorded several albums together.

== Career ==
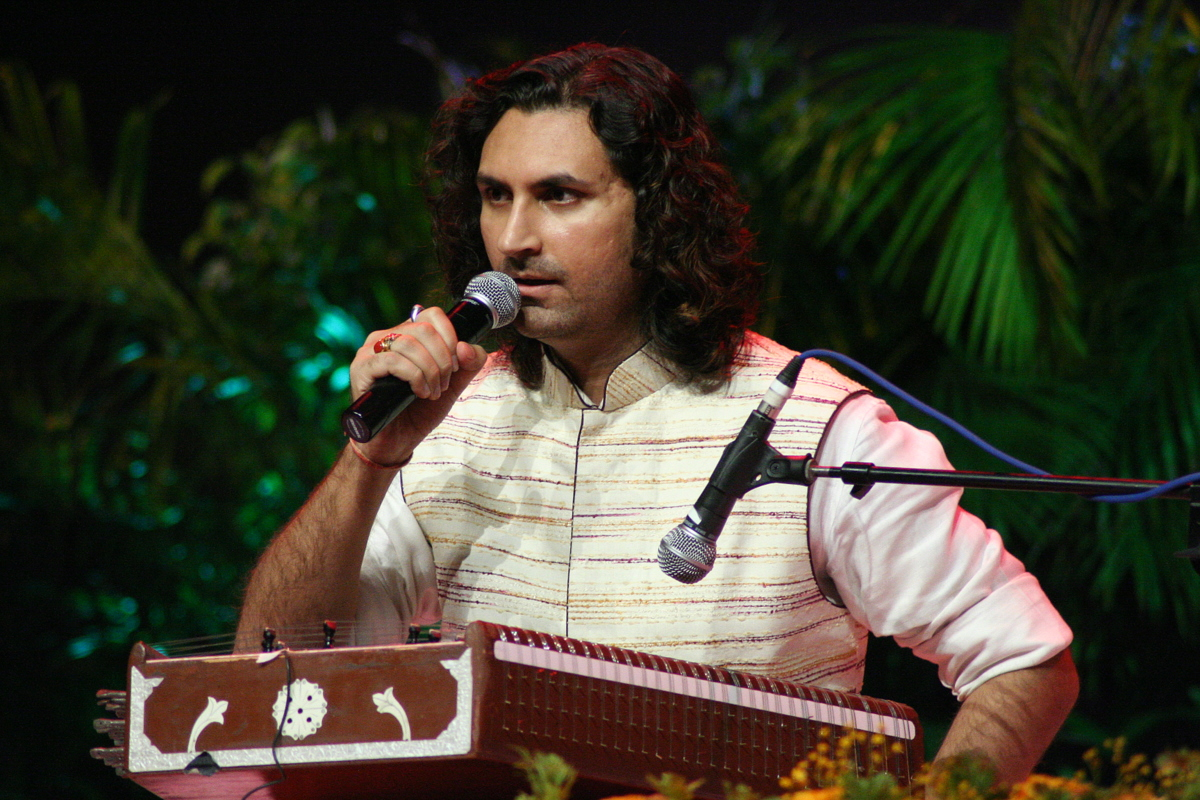
Rahul Sharma performing in Delhi in 2011

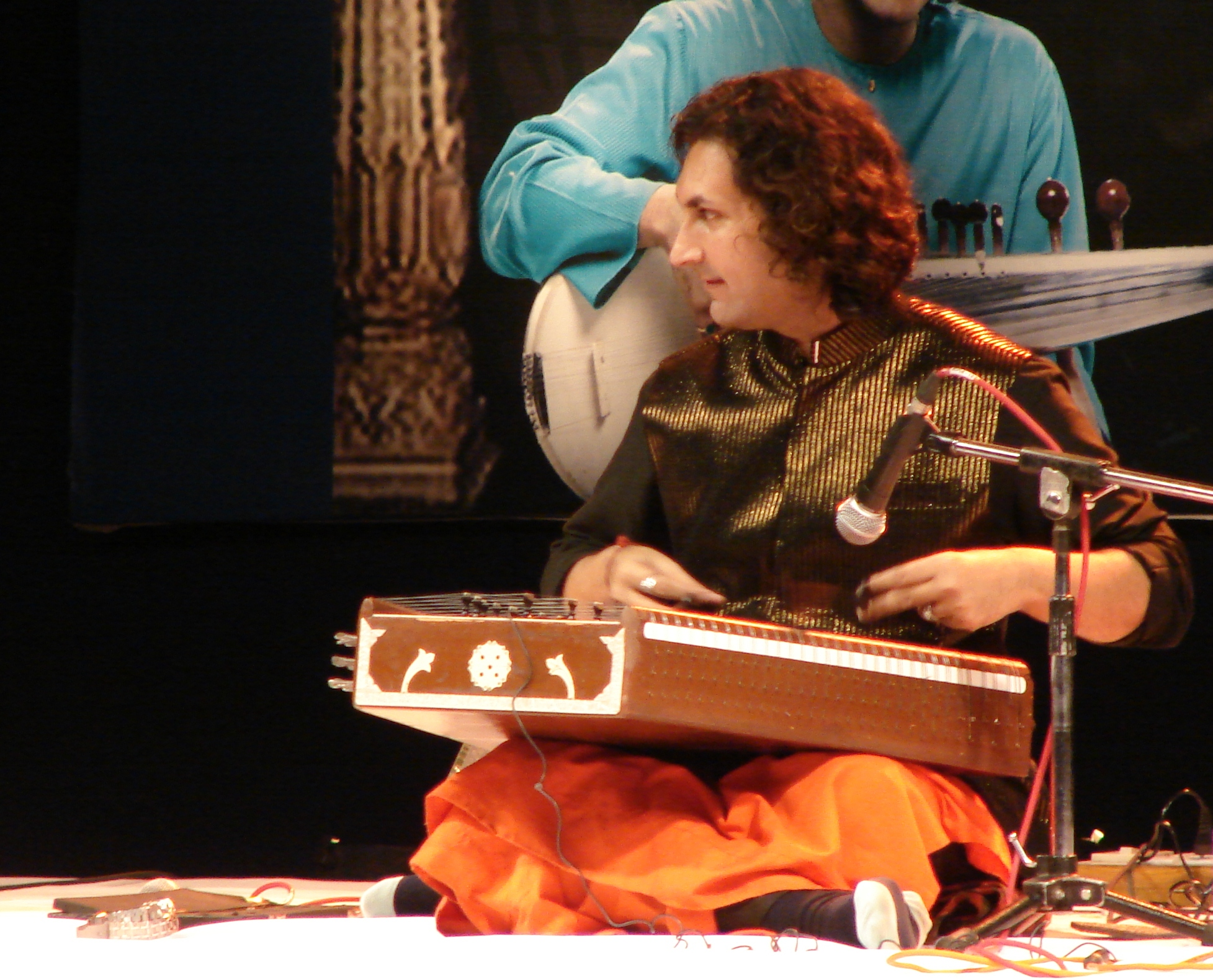
Rahu Sharma performing in Pune in 2012

At the age of 22, Sharma was signed by Peter Gabriel to perform at WOMAD and at the Darbar Festival.

He marked his debut as a film composer with the 2002 romantic comedy film Mujhse Dosti Karoge!. The same year, he released the album Confluence: Santoor & Piano, together with French pianist Richard Clayderman. They followed it with Confluence II in 2008.

In 2012, Sharma composed and recorded the album Namaste, which included musical input from American saxophonist Kenny G. The title song, issued as a single, reached No. 2 on Billboard's world charts and No. 4 on its jazz charts. A year later, he worked with the French world music project Deep Forest on the album Deep India.

In 2016, Sharma received the Sangeet Natak Akademi Award.

In 2021, he composed music and contributed vocals to the soundtrack of Kunal Kohli's television series Ramayug.

As of 2026, Sharma has over 60 albums to his credit, including collaborations with Zakir Hussain, Shafaat Ahmed Khan, Bhavani Shankar, Bickram Ghosh, and Aditya Kalyanpur.

== Personal life ==
Sharma married fashion designer and classical dancer Barkha Sharma in January 2008; they have one son.

== Discography ==
Charted album

Year	Album	Peak chart positions			Label
Year	Album	US Jazz	US Con. Jazz	US World Albums	Label
2012	Namaste – (Kenny G and Rahul Sharma)	8	5	2	Concord

Charted single

Year	Title	Chart positions	Album
Year	Title	Smooth Jazz Airplay	Album
2012	"Namaste" – (Kenny G and Rahul Sharma)	1	Namaste

== Awards ==
- MTV Immies, Best Instrumental Album – Zen (2002)
- Sangeet Natak Akademi Awards (2016)
