= Paramahamsa Madhavdas =

Indian yogi (1798–1921)

Paramahamsa Madhavdas परमहंस माधवदास
- Photo of the Bengali yogi Paramahamsa Madhavdasji, sometime between 1900 and 1920 but the exact date is unknown.

Personal life
- Born: 1798 Phulia, near Shantipur, Nadia
- Died: 1921 (aged 122–123) Malsar, near Baroda, Gujarat
- Known for: Pioneering modern yoga Hatha yoga
- Honors: Paramahamsa, Maharaj

Religious life
- Religion: Hinduism
- Order: Vaishnavism
- School: Yoga

Religious career
- Disciples: Shri Yogendra Swami Kuvalayananda

Paramahamsa Madhavdasji or Paramahamsa Madhavdas (1798–1921) was an Indian yogi, yoga guru and Hindu monk in the 19th century. He was born in 1798 in Bengal. He was initiated as a sadhu (monk) and entered the order of Vaishnavism. He traveled across India on foot for nearly 35 years for knowledge of the practice of yoga. His notable disciple includes Swami Kuvalayananda and Shri Yogendra.

== Biography ==
He was born in 1798 to a Mukhopadhyaya family in the village of Phulia, near Shantipur, in the Nadia District of present-day West Bengal. He was a descendant of Krittiwas Ojha [first writer of Ramayan in Bengali language]. He worked as a clerk in the judicial department but later quit the job. After travelling through Assam, Tibet, the Himalayas and various other places in India, he had an opportunity to have first-hand knowledge of yoga techniques. He was originally a follower of Bhakti order of Chaitanya Mahaprabhu, but later followed the Vaishnavism order influenced by Gauranga.

In 1869, Madhavdas joined a large Sadhu community, who elected him as their leader at Vrindavan (now in Uttar Pradesh) in 1881. But Madhavdas was not satisfied with these activities among the sadhus. He was eager to reduce the sufferings of the commoner. Later, he came to Gujarat and started teaching yoga vedanta. He eventually settled in the village of Malsar near Baroda on the banks of the Narmada River in Gujarat, where he taught the secrets of practicing yoga to a few selected and deserving disciples. Madhavadas died in 1921, at the age of 123.

== Madhavdas Vacuum ==
A noted researcher of Kaivalyadhama Health and Yoga Research Center, Swami Kuvalayananda, discovered the creation of negative pressure in the colon during nauli, one of the yoga kriyas, for the first time in 1924. The discovery of a partial vacuum in the colon during nauli was named the Madhavdas Vacuum after Madhavdas by Swami Kuvalayananda.
