= Jayadeva Yogendra =

Indian yoga guru (1929–2018)

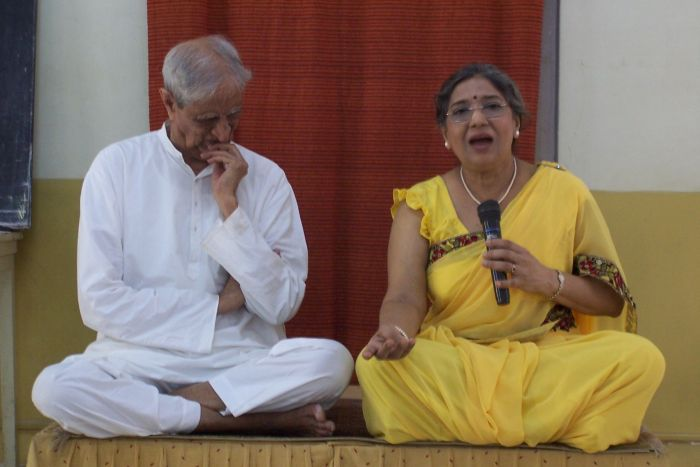
- Dr. Jayadeva (left) and Hansa Yogendra (right)
- Title: President of The Yoga Institute

Personal life
- Born: Jayadeva Desai; 27 April 1929
- Died: 16 February 2018 (aged 88) Mumbai, India
- Spouse: Hansa Yogendra (m.1973)
- Children: Hrishi Yogendra, Patanjali Yogendra
- Parents: Yogendra (father); Sita Devi (mother)
- Notable work(s): Yoga of Caring (1997), Yoga Therapy in Asthma, Diabetes and Heart Disease (1987), Pregnancy, parenthood & Yoga (1994), Yoga Cyclopedia and many
- Education: Bharatiya Vidya Bhavan Educational Trust; Wilson College, Mumbai; Garda College

Religious life
- Religion: Hinduism
- Institute: The Yoga Institute (1918)
- Philosophy: Hatha Yoga

Senior posting
- Teacher: Yogendra
- Period in office: 1958–2018
- Predecessor: Yogendra
- Successor: Hansa Yogendra

Dr. Jayadeva Yogendra (1929–2018) was an Indian yoga guru, researcher, author, educator and president of The Yoga Institute, the oldest organized yoga center in the world, founded by Yogendra in 1918. Yogendra was known for studies on therapeutic effects of Yoga. He pioneered yoga education and has written several books on the therapeutic effects of the ancient science, including Yoga Therapy in Asthma, Diabetes, Heart Disease and Yoga Sutras of Patanjali.

In 1991, Jayadeva designed the first standardized yoga syllabus for National Council of Educational Research and Training.

He died on 17 February 2018 in Mumbai.

== Early life and education ==
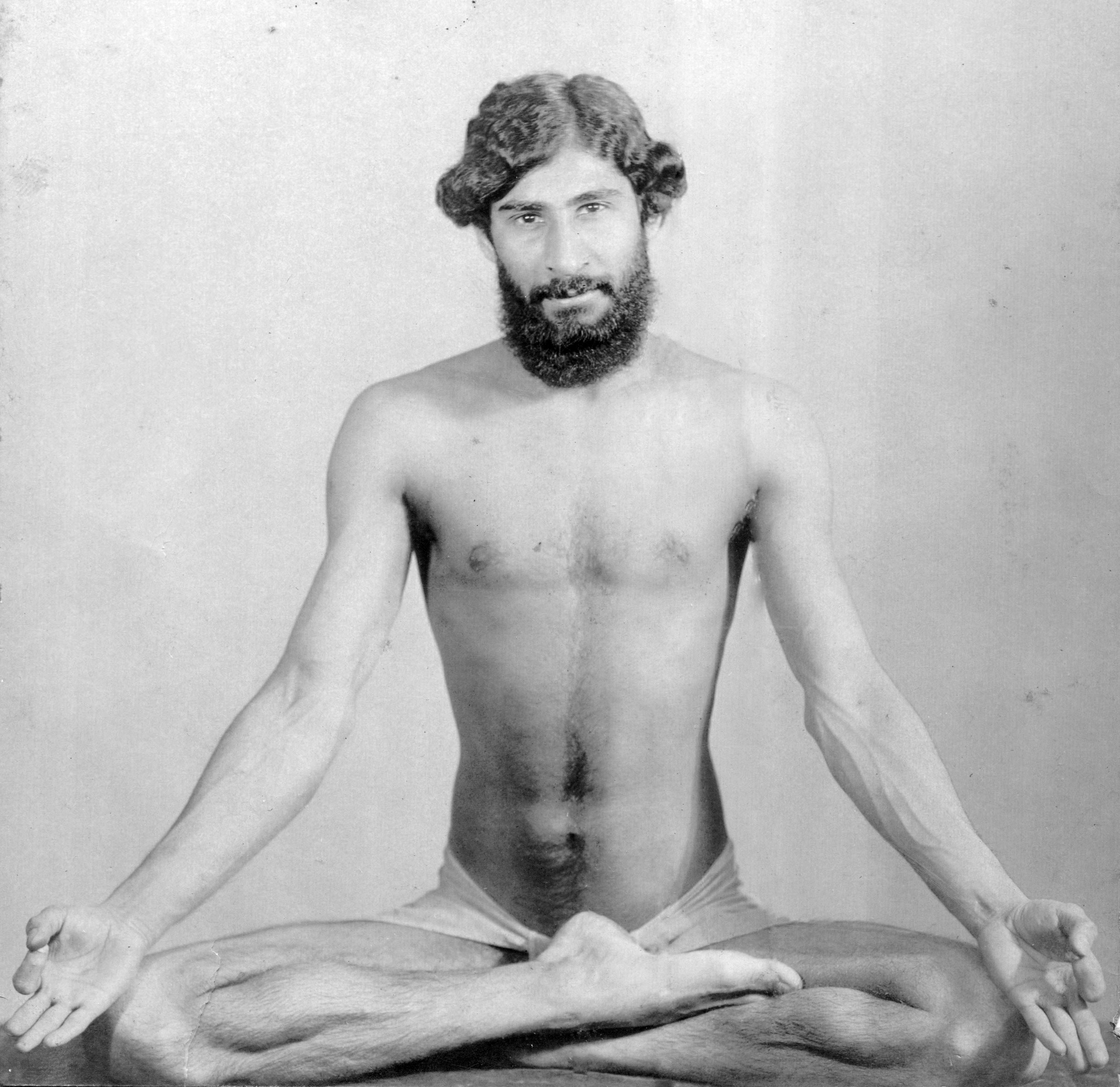
Jayadeva's Guru & father, Shri Yogendra

Jayadeva was born to father Yogendra, a renowned yoga guru and mother Sita Devi on 27 April 1929. He completed his Master's degree in Sāmkhya and Yoga from the University of Mumbai in 1952. In 1955, he received the Hargobindas scholarship for a Ph.D. for his thesis on Moksha Dharma Parva of the Mahabharata. After completing his Ph.D., Dr. Jayadeva worked as a lecturer, who taught Sanskrit at the Guru Nanak Khalsa College, Bombay. He was appointed principal of Teacher Training Institute of Yoga, Bombay, in 1957.

== Work ==
His significant contribution to Yoga renaissance is the introduction of the Bhavas of Buddhi as expounded in the Sāmkhya, along with the practice of Patañjali's classical Yoga.

He prepared the syllabus for teaching Yoga in schools for NCERT in 1991. Jayendra was also the editor of Yoga & Total Health, a monthly journal, published since 1933.

He edited a book ‘Yoga Today’ published by Macmillan Co. of India in 1971. The book carries authentic information on the applicability of yoga for human society.

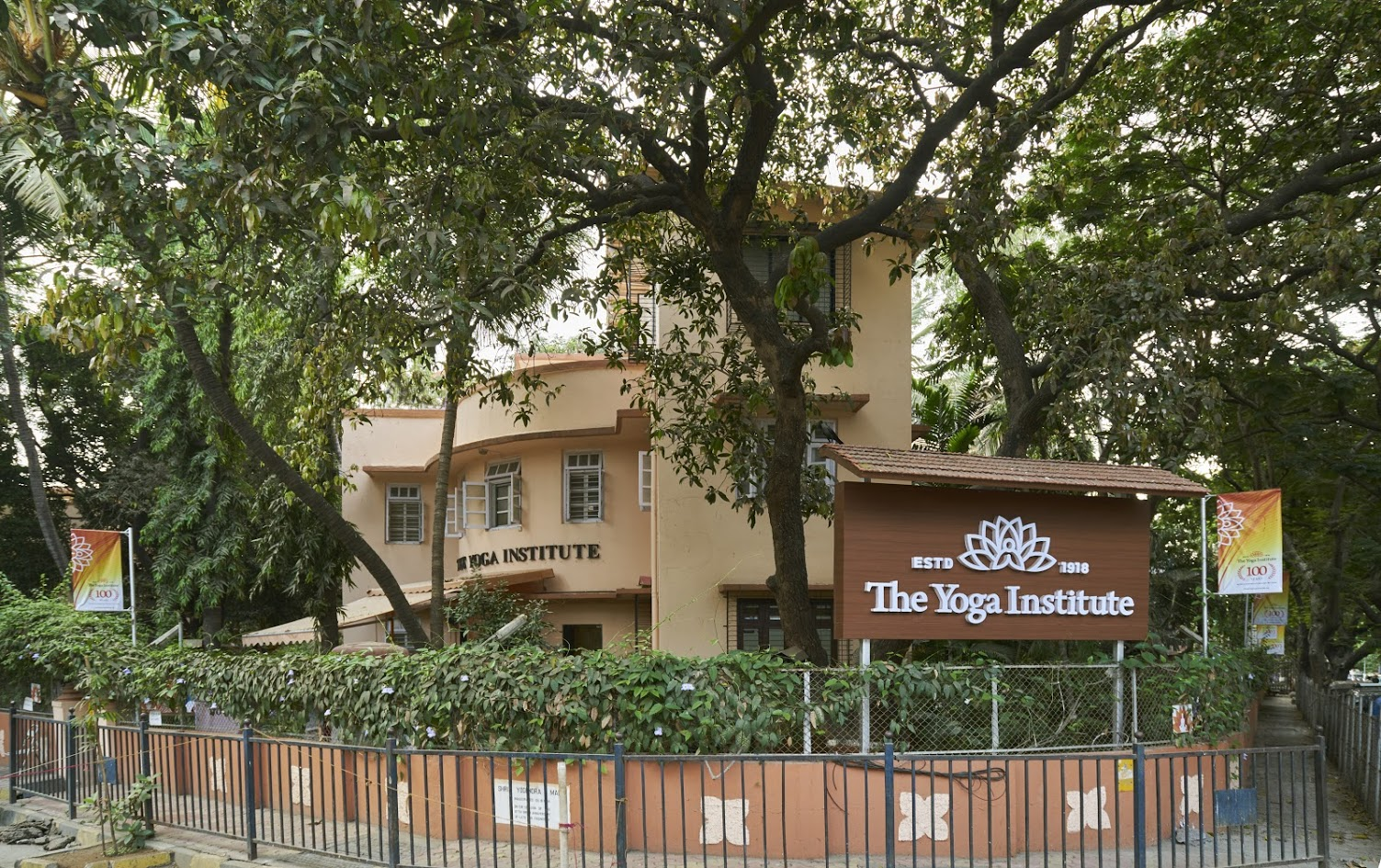
Dr. Jayadeva Yogendra served as President of The Yoga Institute from 1958 to 2018.

In 1997, Jayadeva Yogendra organized the International Conference called WHY- World Householders Yoga Conference, which was presided over by the Dalai Lama. He established the first museum on Yoga in 1987, which was inaugurated by Giani Zail Singh, President of India.

He was the Governing Body member in Central Council for Research in Indian Medicine and Homeopathy and also member of Scientific Advisory Board of Yoga. He carried a survey of Yogis in India and history of Yoga literature published in Yoga and Modern Life 1961.

== Bibliography ==
Dr. Jayadeva has authored several books and edited the Yoga Cyclopedia Series.

- Yoga of Caring (1997), ISBN 8185053375
- Yoga Therapy in Asthma, Diabetes and Heart Disease (1987), ISBN 8185053308
- Yogic life : a cure for asthma & bronchitis (1993), ISBN 978-81-85053-32-5
- Pregnancy, parenthood & Yoga (1994)
- Insights through Yoga (2000), ISBN 9788185053530
- Problems and Solutions (2006), ISBN 8185053529
- Your Words Our Path (2005), ISBN 8185053677
- Inspiration (2003), ISBN 8185053626
- Reflections (1999), ISBN 8185053480
- Master Strokes Volume I (2004), ISBN 8185053650
- Master Strokes Volume II (2006), ISBN 8185053685
- Yoga Sutras of Patanjali (2009), ISBN 9789385902659
- Yoga Cyclopedia Volume I – Asanas and hundred topics starting with letter ‘A’ (1988), ISBN 8185053197
- Yoga Cyclopedia Volume II – Letter ‘B’ and Yoga Education for the Child and the Adult (1988), ISBN 8185053227
- Yoga Cyclopedia Volume III – Stress Management and Mental Health (1993)
- Yoga Cyclopedia Volume IV – Mystics and Demystifying Mysticism (2006), ISBN 818505374X
- Yoga in Modern Life (1996)
- Yoga Today

== Recantation ==
- He was featured in Who's Who India in 1972 and 2000.

== Death ==
Jayadeva Yogendra died on 16 February 2018. He was survived by his wife Hansa and son Hrishi. The Ministry of AYUSH and Morarji Desai National Institute of Yoga paid tribute to Jayendra Yogendra at the International Yoga Festival in New Delhi on 22 March 2018.
