= Yogendra Kumar Joshi =

Yogendra Kumar Joshi from the Georgia Institute of Technology, Atlanta, GA was named Fellow of the Institute of Electrical and Electronics Engineers (IEEE) in 2012 for contributions to microfabricated cooling devices.
