= Yogendra Vyas =

Indian writer and linguist (1940–2021)

Yogendra Dhirubhai Vyas
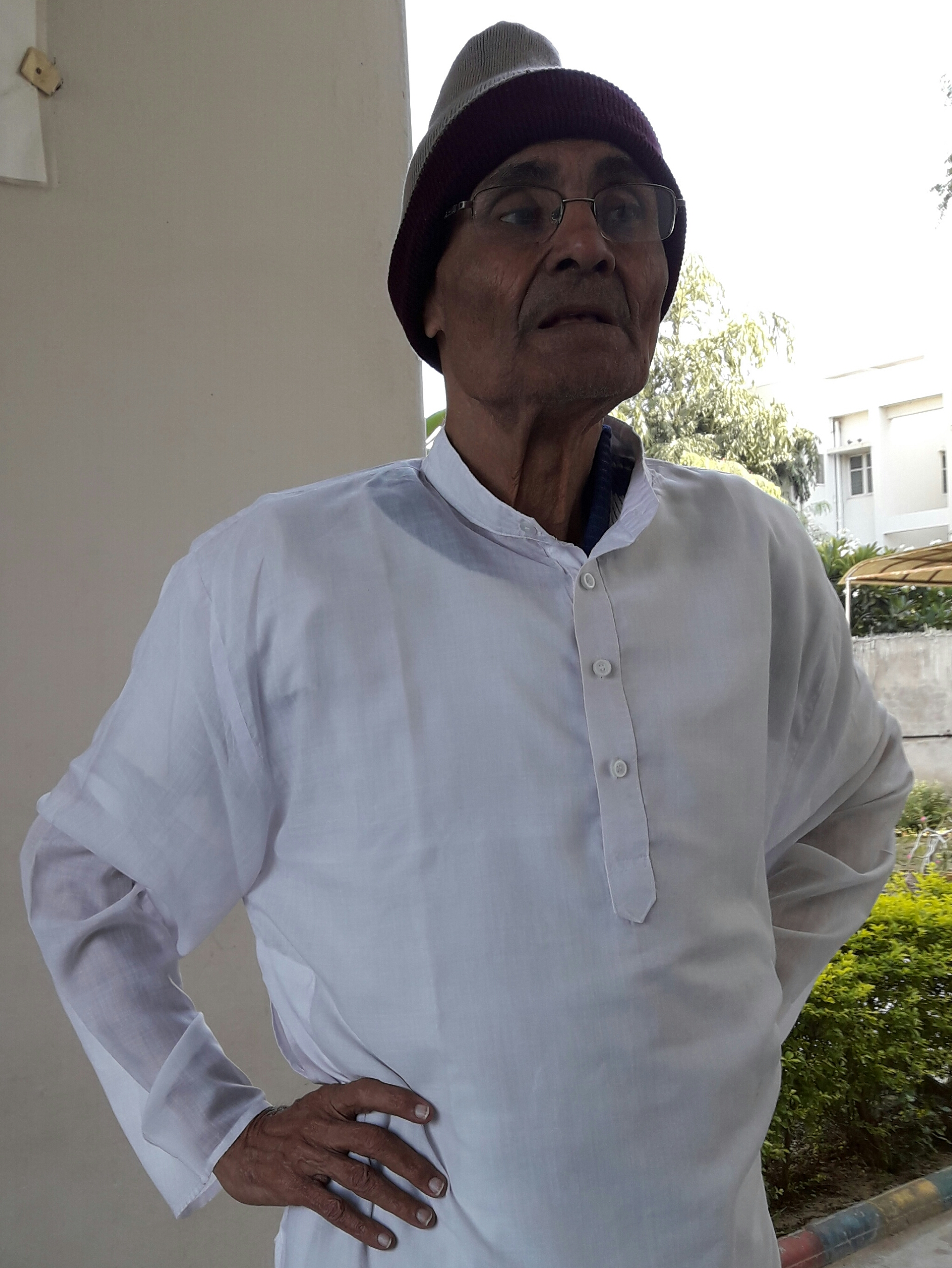
- Vyas at Trimandir, Adalaj, Gujarat in November 2016
- Born: 6 October 1940; Ahmedabad
- Died: 23 September 2021 (aged 80); Ahmedabad
- Education: M.A., Ph.D.
- Occupations: writer; linguist
- Writing career
- Language: Gujarati

Academic background
- Thesis: A Linguistic Study of Bhili Dialects: A Descriptive Study of Central and North Bhili (1967)
- Doctoral advisor: Prabodh Pandit

Yogendra Dhirubhai Vyas (6 October 1940 – 23 September 2021) was a Gujarati writer and linguist from Gujarat, India. He is known for his linguistic study of Gujarati language. Born and raised in Ahmedabad, Vyas studied at Gujarat University, from where he obtained his doctorate in study of Bhili dialect under the supervision of Prabodh Pandit.

== Biography ==
A native of Bhalod (village in Bharuch district), Yogendra Vyas was born on 6 October 1940 in Ahmedabad, where he was raised. He completed his study in Ahmedabad.

He received his B.A. in 1961 from Gujarat College with Gujarati and Sanskrit subject. In 1963, he received his M.A. in Linguistics from Gujarat University. During 1961–63, he was appointed a Dakshina Fellow from Gujarat College. He received a postgraduate diploma in Linguistics from Deccan College, Pune in 1963. He received his doctorate in 1967 from Gujarat University under Prabodh Pandit for his thesis A Linguistic Study of Bhili Dialects: A Descriptive Study of Central and North Bhili. The thesis is based on the study of Bhili language.

He served as principal at Surendranagar Girls College till 1966, and then joined Arts and Commerce College, Ahmedabad as principal. He was appointed a lecturer in November 1969 and promoted to the head of department in June 1974 and retired in October 2002.

Vyas, along with his wife Anjana Vyas (aged 74), committed suicide by hanging on 23 September 2021.

== Works ==
Vyas wrote many books on linguistics in the Gujarati language, along with two novels, a short story collection, and some miscellaneous works. He presented discourses on theoretical study of various branches of linguistics in Gujarati. He studied the sounds of Gujarati language from the points of view of articulatory, auditory and acoustic phonetics in his book Bhasha ane Tenu Bhautik Swarup (Language and Its Physical Form; 1966).

He wrote two novels: Be Kinarani Vachche and Krishnajanma. He wrote a biographical work, Divo Na Bujhe (1986). He edited several volumes including Anandyatrana Sathio (2004), Anandgharni Vatsalyamurti, and Suvasni Lahani. His works of children's literature include Bhilini Kishorkathao and Manoranjak Bodhkathao.

== Awards ==
Vyas received the state government awards for his three books on languages in 1974, 1976 and 1977.

== See also ==
- List of Gujarati-language writers
