= Hansa Yogendra =

Indian yoga guru, author, researcher and TV personality

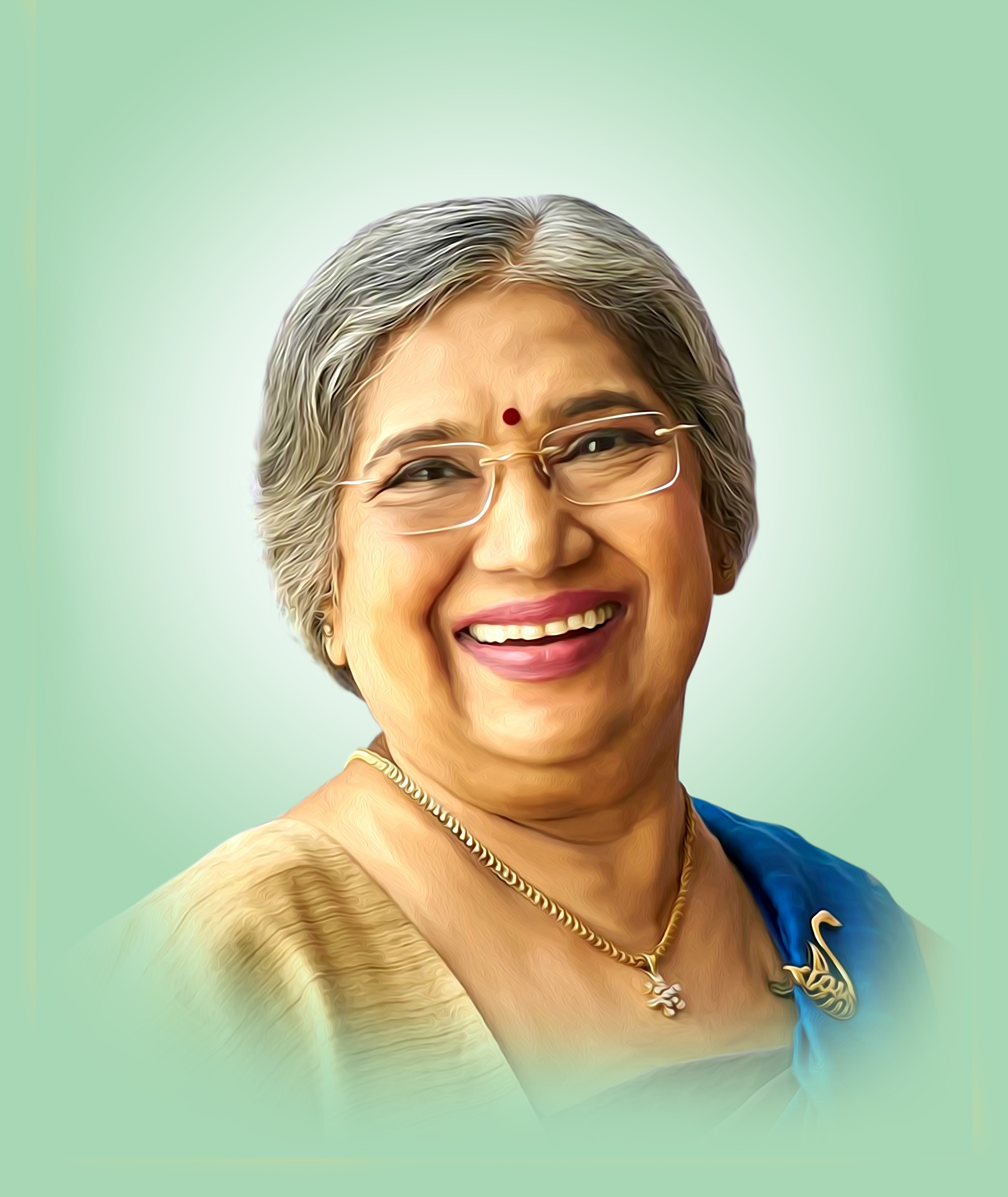
- Hansa Yogendra
- Born: Hansa Patni; 8 October 1947 (age 78); Indore, Madhya Pradesh, India
- Education: BSc., LLB
- Alma mater: Mithibai College; Government Law College, Mumbai
- Occupations: Yoga Guru, Author, Researcher & Director of The Yoga Institute
- Organization: The Yoga Institute
- Known for: Yoga
- Television: Yoga for Better Living on DD National (1980); Yoga Sutra on Zee TV
- Title: President of The Yoga Institute
- Term: February 2018-
- Predecessor: Jayadeva Yogendra
- Spouse: Jayadeva Yogendra
- Family: Shri Yogendra (father-in-law)

Hansa Yogendra (born 8 October 1947) is an Indian yoga teacher, author, researcher, and television presenter. She is the director of The Yoga Institute, a non-profit yoga organization based in Mumbai, which was founded in 1918 by her father-in-law, Yogendra.

She was presenter of the television series Yoga for Better Living, aired on DD National in 1980s. She is the chair of the Yoga Certification Committee for Quality Council of India (QCI) and President of the International Board of Yoga. She is the Vice President of the Indian Yoga Association.

== Early life ==
Born on 8 October 1947 to Jitendra Phulchand Patni and Tara Patni, in a Jain family, she completed her graduation in science from Mithibai College. Later, she completed her Yoga teacher training course at The Yoga Institute. She holds a degree in law from the Government Law College, Mumbai. She received a Ph.D from The Open International University for Complementary Medicines in February 2018.

== Works ==
In 1991, she and Jayadeva Yogendra advised the National Council of Educational Research and Training on a Yoga education syllabus for schools in India. She has conducted several seminars and lecture tours in India and in Canada, Pakistan, Europe, Hong Kong, Australia and the USA.

Her book, Yoga For All (2018) was released by C. Vidyasagar Rao, the Governor of Maharashtra in January 2019. It took her 3 years to finish the book, based on a hundred years of research by The Yoga Institute.

=== Bibliography ===
- Yoga Daily Planner - Heart Care, (1990) ISBN 978-8185053318
- Yogic Life-Cure of Asthma and Bronchitis, (1992) ISBN 978-8185053325
- Pregnancy, Parenthood and Yoga, (1991) ISBN 978-8185053257
- Dincharya, (1997)
- Yoga for Back and Joint disorders, (1997) ISBN 978-8185053363
- Recipes For Happiness:Yogic lifestyle diet, (2002) ISBN 978-8185053561
- Recipes for Happiness, (2001) ISBN 978-81-85053-56-1
- Yogic Life-Control of Diabetes, (1992) ISBN 81-85053-33-2
- Yoga of Caring, (1997) ISBN 978-8185053370
- Thoughts on the Gita ISBN 9788185053493
- Marriage A Spiritual Journey, (2010) ISBN 978-81-85053-80-6
- Insights through Yoga, (2000) ISBN 978-8185053530
- Swadhaya Practical Tips—For self-development, (2007) ISBN 978-81-85053-78-3
- Yoga for the Police, (2011) ISBN 978-81-85053-82-0
- Yoga for the Police - Tanmanachya Swasthya Sathi, (2011) ISBN 978-81-85053-82-0
- Yoga of Caring, (2015) ISBN 978-93-84670-04-7
- Inspiration, (2003)
- Yoga Sutra of Patanjali, (2009) ISBN 978-81-85053-79-0
- How to Reverse Heart Disease the Yogic Way-Research, Facts and Program, (2004) ISBN 978-8185053660
- Values of Life, (2005) ISBN 978-81-85053-76-9
- Growing with Yoga, (2008) ISBN 978-8185053448
- Yoga for All: Discovering the True Essence of Yoga, (2018) ISBN 978-9353040857

== Personal life ==
She married Jayadeva Yogendra in 1973.

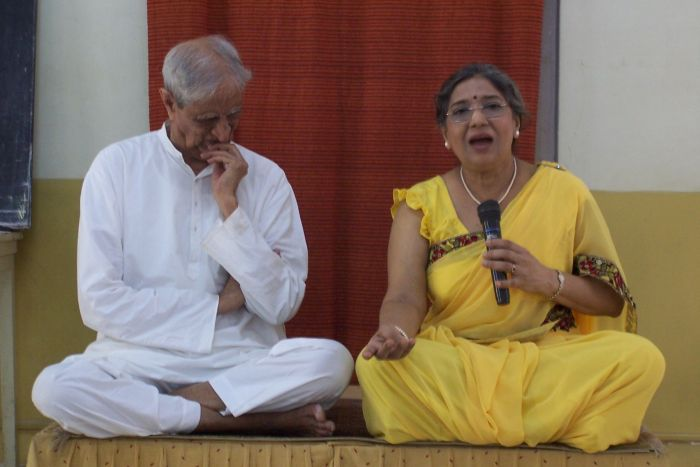
Hansa Yogendra with husband Jayadeva Yogendra

She is daughter-in-law of Shri Yogendra.

== Awards & distinctions ==
- 1994 Vocational Excellence Award by Rotary Club of Bombay
- Award for contribution to Women's Health from the Society for the Promotion of Area Resource Centres.
- 2011 Special Award by The International Association of Yoga Therapists for pioneering work in Yoga Therapy, Yoga education and research in 2011.
- Yoga Tapaswini title at Pune International Yoga Week
- Award of Excellence by Podar International School for her contribution to Yoga education.
- 2015 Special Award by Lions Clubs International
- 2015 Keynote speaker at International Conference on Yoga for Holistic Health at Vigyan Bhawan, New Delhi
- 2017 Rotary International Award for her contribution to spread the awareness of Yoga at Hotel Sahara Star, Mumbai
- 2018 Chief guest at Pune International Yoga Festival
- 2018 Vocational Excellence Award by Rotary Discon, Utsav
- 2018 PhD. from The Open International University for Complementary Medicines
- 2018 Divine Shakti Leadership Award at Parmarth Niketan, International Yoga Festival
- 2019 National Yoga Award 2019 from Prime Minister Narendra Modi.
- 2025: ELLE Beauty Awards
