= Morarji Desai National Institute of Yoga =

Indian autonomous yoga organization

- Former name: Central Research Institute for Yoga (CRIY)
- Motto in English: Health, Harmony and Happiness for all through Yoga
- Type: Registered Society
- Established: 1998; 28 years ago
- Director: Dr. Kashinath Samagandi
- Location: New Delhi, Delhi, India; 28°37′33″N 77°12′26″E
- Campus: Lutyens’ Zone
- Nickname: MDNIY
- Website: Official Web Site

The Morarji Desai National Institute of Yoga (acronym MDNIY) is an autonomous organisation under the Ministry of Ayush, Government of India. It is the nodal agency for Planning, Training, Promotion and Coordination of Yoga Education, Training, Therapy and Research.

== History ==
The Morarji Desai National Institute of Yoga, established through the Government of India under the Ministry of Ayush, is committed to encouraging the yoga practice and knowledge across the country.

Its purpose is to promote the yoga teacher Training and provide advanced research in this area. MDNIY has been organizing Yoga Mahotsav annually since 2016. Yoga Mahotsav is a curtain raiser for International Day of Yoga to sensitize the masses regarding celebration of IDY.

Common Yoga Protocol and Yoga DVD for International Day of Yoga, celebrated on 21 June, were prepared by the Institute in consultation with the eminent yoga experts and officials from various Ministries, Govt. of India.

The institute was started in 1970, in the form a hospital, opened by the now defunct Central Council for Research in Indian Systems of Medicine and Homeopathy, under the Vishwayatan Yogashram. The hospital was later converted into an institute, by name, Central Research Institute for Yoga (CRIY) in 1976, to provide free training to people and to organize research on yoga. In 1988, the institute was further renamed as the Morarji Desai National Institute of Yoga with expanded mandates.

== Facilities ==
The institute is housed in a campus measuring 2.818 acres, and is equipped with the amenities such as a conference hall with audio visual facilities accommodating 50 people, an auditorium with a capacity of 140 people, a library with a collection of over 9000 books on yoga and related topics, a practice hall (Kriya block) for 30 people, an academic block for classes and practices, an out-patient facility where therapists, dietitians and medical officers offer consultancy services, a laboratory with physiological and biochemical testing and research facilities, an x-ray unit and a multi media centre with audio-visual support.

== Departments ==
Teaching Department: The faculty of MDNIY is classified into eight sub sections, each catering to a specific branch of study such as Yoga Education, Yoga Therapy, Yoga Philosophy, Yoga and Human Consciousness, Anatomy, Physiology, Allied Sciences and Languages. The department of Allied sciences focusses on alternative medicine systems such as Ayurveda and Naturopathy as well as clinical support functions of Dietetics & Nutrition, Hospital Management and Computer Science. The Department of Languages is a teaching centre for Sanskrit, English and Hindi languages.

Yoga Education Department: The institute offers three themes of yoga education, Diploma in Yoga Science, Certificate Course in Yoga Science for Target Group and Continuing Medical Education programme on Yoga

== Courses ==
MDNIY conducts several courses for the general public as well as yoga trainers.

- Yoga Training Programs
- Yoga Education
- Special Programme
- Scientific Research
- Publication and Propagation
- International Activities
- Extension Activities

It also facilitates advanced research on yoga.

== Yoga therapy centres ==
The Institute manages four yoga training centers in the state of Delhi.

- Yoga Therapy Centre, Vallabhbhai Patel Chest Institute, University of Delhi, North Campus, Delhi – 110 007
- Rajan Babu Institute of Pulmonary Medicine and Tuberculosis, Dhaka Colony, Kingsway Camp, Delhi – 110 009
- LRS Institute of Tuberculosis and Respiratory Diseases, Sri Aurobindo Marg, Mehrauli, New Delhi – 110 030.
- Institute of Human Behavior and Allied Sciences, Jhilmil, Dilshad Garden, Delhi – 110 095

In addition to these centers, MDNIY also assists NGOs and other agencies in setting up nodal centers at various parts of the country.

== Publications ==
MDNIY has published several books on yoga as well as taken up many publications of other yoga centres for distribution.

- Yogic Management of Arthritis
- Yogic of Respiratory Disorders
- Yogic Management of Gynecological Disorders
- Yogic Management of Geriatric Disorders
- Yogic Management of Neurological Disorders
- Yogic Management of Psychiatric Disorders
- Yoga Training Manual for School Children
- Bi-Monthly Lecture Series
- Yoga for Common Disorders
- Yoga for Wellness by The Yoga Institute, Santacruz, Mumbai
- Yoga for Wellness by Kaivalyadhama, Lonavla, Pune
- Yoga for Wellness by Ramamani Iyengar Memorial Yoga Institute, Pune
- Yoga for Wellness by Krishnamacharya Yoga Mandiram, Chennai
- Yoga for Wellness by Isha Yoga Foundation, Coimbatore
- Yoga for Wellness by International Centre for Yoga Education and Research (ICYER), Puducherry
- Yoga for Wellness by Swami Rama Sadhak Gram, Rishikesh
- Yoga for Holistic Personality Development by Ramamani Iyengar Memorial Yoga Institute, Pune
- Yoga for Holistic Personality Development by The Yoga Institute, Santacruze (East), Mumbai
- Yoga for Holistic Personality Development by Kaivalyadhama S.M.Y.M. Samiti, Lonavala, Pune
- Yoga for Holistic Personality Development by SVYAM University, Bangalore
- A Yogic approach to Holistic Personality Development By Yoganjali Natyalayam, Puduchery
- Understanding and Development of our Personality by Prof. C. G. Deshpande, Pune
- Yoga Calendars on 10 topics ((CD) Hindi and English)
- Yoga for All (CD) (English & Hindi)
- Yoga for Women (CD) (English & Hindi)

The Institute publishes a quarterly journal, Yoga Vijnana (Science of Yoga) where articles written by experts and authorities of yoga and other relevant information are published.

== See also ==
- Yoga physiology
- List of asanas
- List of yoga schools
- Yoga series
