= Yogendra =

Indian yoga guru and poet (1897–1989)

Shri Yogendra Gujarati: યોગેન્દ્ર
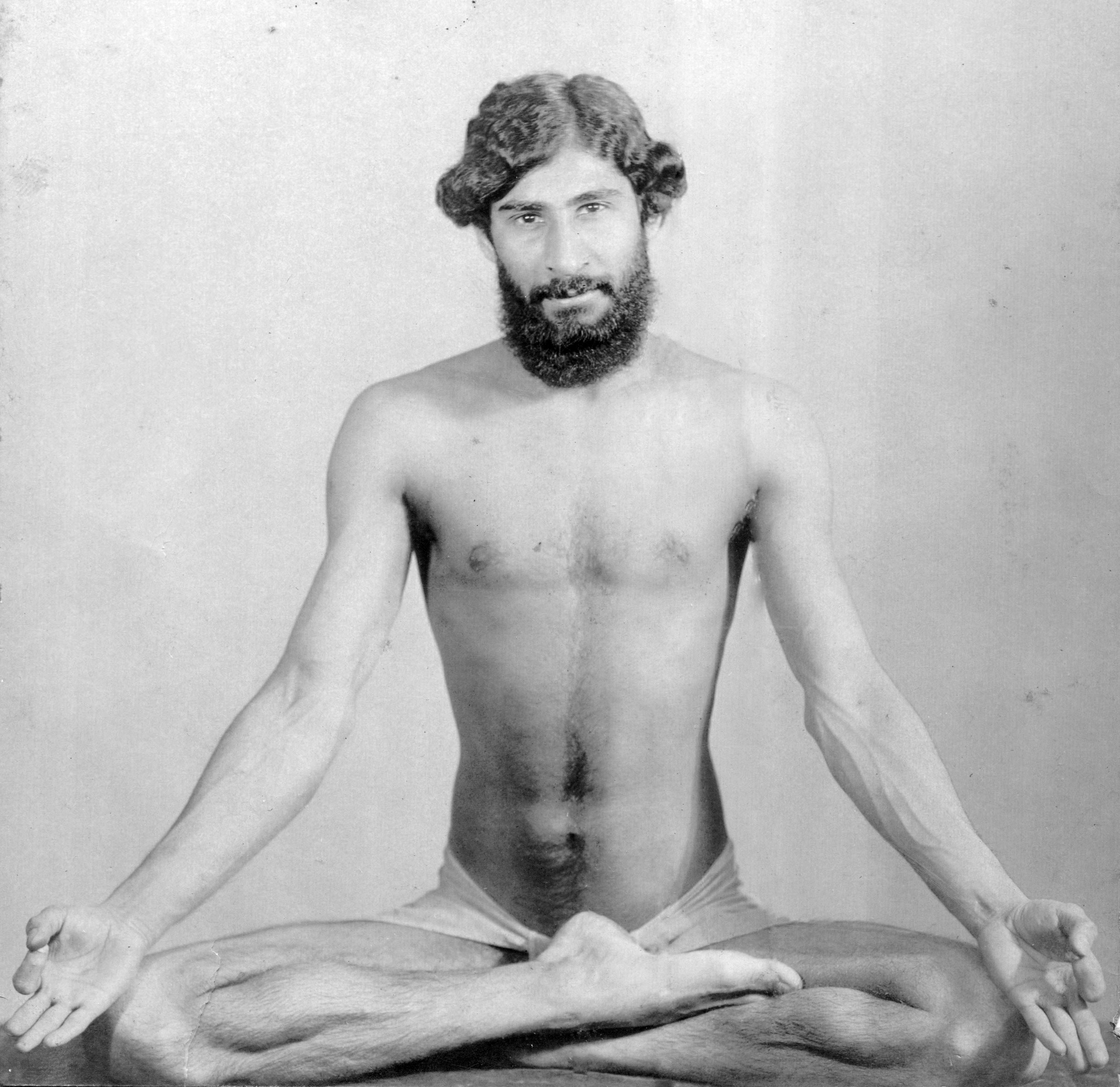
- Yogendra in his early years, sitting in Siddhasana

Personal life
- Born: Manibhai Haribhai Desai; 18 November 1897 Surat, Gujarat, British India
- Died: 24 September 1989 (aged 91)
- Spouse: Sita Devi (m.1927)
- Children: 2, including Jayadeva Yogendra
- Education: Amalsad English School, near Surat; St. Xavier's College, Mumbai
- Known for: Pioneering modern yoga
- Pen name: Mastamani

Religious life
- Religion: Hinduism
- Founder of: The Yoga Institute (1918)

Religious career
- Teacher: Paramahamsa Madhavdasji

Manibhai Haribhai Desai (1897–1989), known as (Shri) Yogendra was an Indian yoga guru, author, poet, researcher and was one of the important figures in the modern revival and transformation of hatha yoga, both in India and United States. He was the founder of The Yoga Institute, the oldest organized yoga centre in the world, established in 1918. He is often referred as the Father of Modern Yoga Renaissance. He was one of the figures responsible for reviving the practice of asanas and making yoga accessible to people other than renunciates.

Yogendra innovated modern methods to teach yoga, initiating research in yoga, particularly in the field of yoga therapy. He authored several books on yoga and started the journal Yoga in 1933. He was also a poet, writing under the pen name 'Mastamani'. He translated Rabindranath Tagore's Gitanjali into Gujarati.

== Biography ==
=== Early years ===
Yogendra was born as Manibhai Desai in an Anavil Brahmin family on 18 November 1897 in a village near Surat, Gujarat. He was affectionately called Mogha ("priceless one") in his childhood. His father Haribhai Jivanji Desai was a school teacher. His mother died when he was three years old.

At the age of eighteen in 1916, after distinguishing himself in the Amalsad English School, Yogendra attended St. Xavier's College in Bombay. He felt homesick and fell into depression and lost his interest in studies. At the urging of his roommate, On 26 August 1916, Yogendra visited the Dharamshala of Paramahamsa Madhavadasaji at Madhav Baug, regardless of his robust suspicion of sannyasis and sadhus. However, in Paramahamsa ni Prasadi (1917), he wrote that his misgivings disappeared "as our eyes met" and as it turns out, Madhavadasaji was equally struck by Yogendra's qualities as a capable disciple.

Yogendra's guru, Paramahamsa Madhavdasji, c. 1930

After a period of courtship through letters, Yogendra left his college and went to Madhavadasaji's Ashram in Malsar, near Vadodara in late 1916. He received special attention and it was clear that he was being educated and groomed to be Madhavadasaji's successor. Yogendra learned Yoga, much of the teaching being on the practical and pragmatic use of Yoga and its application in sickness and suffering. His training in the Ashram was centered around yogic 'natural health cures' administered to patients in the ashram's sick ward. Yogendra left the Ashram after more than two years.

=== Works ===
On 25 November 1918, Yogendra established The Yoga Institute at the residence of Dadabhai Naoroji at Versova Beach in Bombay (now Mumbai). A year later in 1919, Yogendra left for Europe and the United States, with the aim of popularizing Yoga and set up a branch of the institute, The Yoga Institute of America at Harriman in New York. His system of asanas, which helped to create the modern yoga movement, was influenced by the physical culture of Europeans such as Max Müller, author of the 1891 book Physical Religion. Yogendra began the process of "domesticating" hatha yoga, seeking scientific evidence for yoga's health benefits. This helped to undo the negative image of yoga and asana practice.

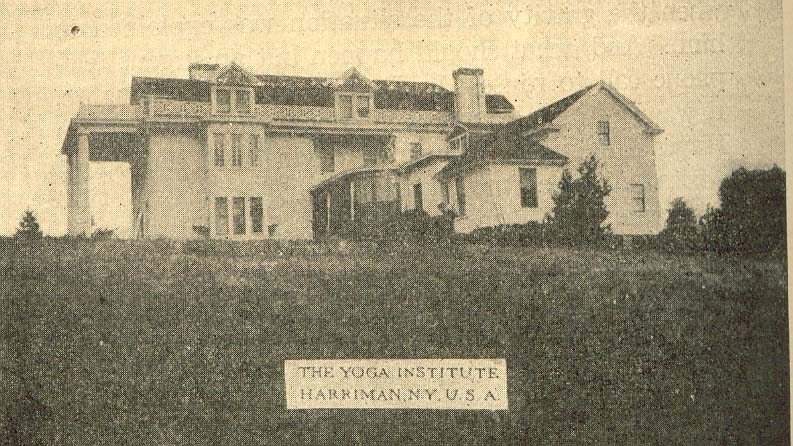
The Yoga Institute in Harriman, New York in 1920

In US, among the people Yogendra met was Benedict Lust, one of the founders of naturopathic medicine. Benedict Lust saw the value of Hatha Yoga for his work and studied it with him. Yogendra stayed there working with a number of Avant-garde doctors such as John Harvey Kellogg and Benedict Lust. Along with the early experiments on yoga, he finished his first books while in US, Light on Hatha Yoga and a volume on Rabindranath Tagore.

He went back to India less than 5 years later; he tried to return to the USA, but was thwarted by the restrictive immigration legislation of 1924.

Shri Yogendra was a new type of Asian teacher. Neither an ancient chanter of texts nor a renunciate hidden away for years in Himalayan hills, like Vivekananda, he was already partially a Westerner before he ever came to the United States. Growing up in British India, matriculating — before he met his guru — at St. Xavier's College in Bombay, translating the Yogic message into a specific argot, linking his religion-philosophical views to those of Plotinus and Henri Bergson, Shri Yogendra was a blended product of East and West.

— Jeffrey J. Kripal and Glenn Shuck wrote in his book On the Edge of the Future

The yoga researcher Elliott Goldberg described Yogendra's system of asanas as "safer, more comprehensive, and more effective than Müller's system", and commented that Yogendra "helped strip hatha yoga of .. what he called 'mysticism and inertia'", enabling people to think about asanas "unencumbered by traditional ideology".

=== Research ===
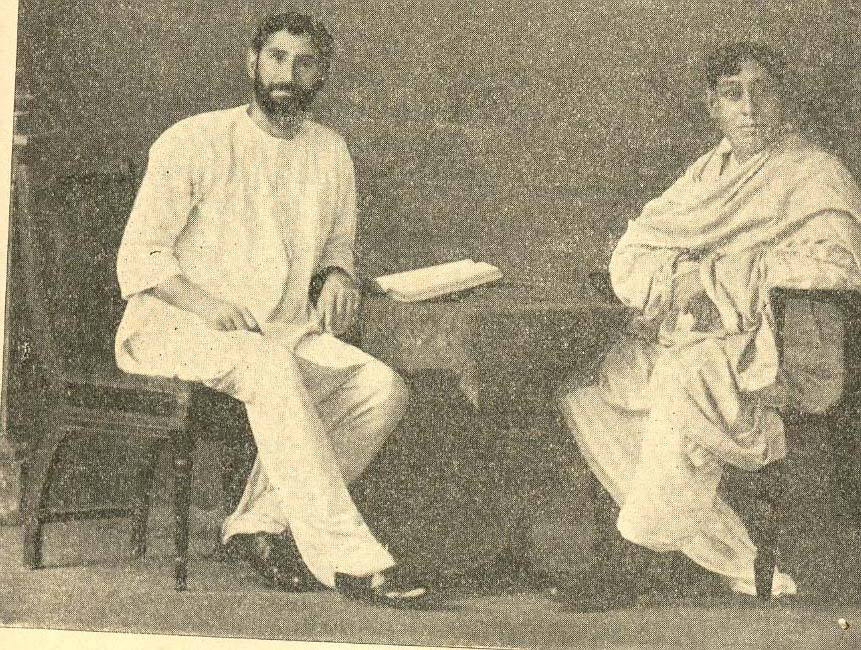
Yogendra with Dr. Surendranath Dasgupta in 1924

In 1921, Yogendra conducted X-Ray studies on Sutra Neti kriyas, a yogic technique to clean the nasal cavity. He conducted research on Prana with Surendranath Dasgupta, an orientalist and philosopher in 1924. In 1930, manuscript 'Yoga Personal Hygiene', authored by Yogendra, is the first book on intricate Yoga processes listing research on the yoga breathing techniques Uddiyana bandha and Pranayama.

=== Contribution to literature ===
Yogendra's first book, Prabhubhakti ("Devotion to the Lord"), was published by Diamond Jubilee Printing Press in Ahmadabad. His second book was Hrudayapushpanjali ("Prayer from the Heart"), a collection of his poetry composed in 1917.

Principal A. B. Yagnik, a Gujarati critic wrote in an article, Poetic Versatility of Shri Yogendra, published in 1979,

We here enter the poet's esthetic world and are delighted with his exquisite reflections. At this stage he might as well have been on the road to Yoga, but not reached there.

— "Poetic Versatility of Shri Yogendra", Journal of The Yoga Institute, November 1979

He was inspired and influenced by the works of Rabindranath Tagore. He translated Ravindranath Tagore's Gitanjali from Bengali to Gujarati; it was published in 1918, with Tagore's permission.The country was full of Indian nationalism, and his 1919 poetry collection Rashtriyagita, speaks of the homeland, the citizens and the struggle for freedom. Other books of his poetry collection includes Pranay Bansi, Sangita Dhvani (2017) and Urmi (2014).

== Bibliography ==
=== Books on Yoga ===
Yogendra published many books on yoga, and they have often been reprinted.

- Memorabilia (1926)
- Yoga Asanas Simplified (1928)
- Yoga Physical Education - Volume 1 (1928)
- Yoga Personal Hygiene Simplified (1931)
- Hatha-Yoga Simplified (1931)
- Simple Meditative Postures (1934)
- Rhythmic Exercises (1936)
- Way to Live (1936)
- Breathing Methods (1936)
- Yoga Personal Hygiene (1940)
- Yoga: Physical Education (1956)
- Yoga Essays (1969)
- Facts about Yoga (1971)
- Why Yoga (1976)
- Yoga–Sutras (1978
- Life Problems (1978)
- Guide to Yoga Meditation (1983)
- Yoga in Modern Life

=== Poetry collections ===
- Prabhubhakti
- Hrdayapushpanjali
- Pranay Bansi
- Sangita Dhwani (1917)
- Rashtriya Gita (1919)
- Gitanjali of Tagore (1917)
- Urmi (1924)
- Kavi Tagore (1926)

== Personal life ==
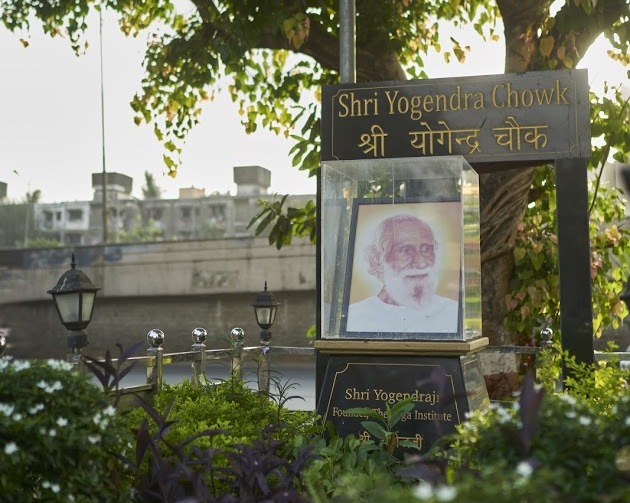
Shri Yogendra Chowk at Santacruz, Mumbai is named after him.

He married Sita Devi in 1927. The couple had two sons, named Jayadeva Yogendra and Vijayadev Yogendra.

Yogendra died on 25 September 1989 at the age of 91 in Mumbai.

== Legacy ==
In 1994, The Brihanmumbai Municipal Corporation renamed the TPS 5 Prabhat Colony as Yogendra Marg (Yogendra Way) after Yogendra.

A Chowk named Shri Yogendra Chowk located in Santacruz, Mumbai, is named after him, was inaugurated by Suresh Prabhu, the Minister of Railways, Govt. of India in April 2017.

His son Vijayadev Yogendra (1930–2005) immigrated to Australia and continued his father's work through the establishment of the Total Health and Education Foundation in Melbourne and The School of Total Education in Warwick, Queensland.

== Sources ==
- Goldberg, Elliott (2016). The Path of Modern Yoga: The History of an Embodied Spiritual Practice. Simon & Schuster. ISBN 9781620555682.
- Singleton, Mark (2010). Yoga Body : the origins of modern posture practice. Oxford University Press. ISBN 978-0-19-539534-1. OCLC 318191988.
