= Dakkhina Stupa =

- දක්ඛිණ ස්තුපය/දකුණු දාගැබ தக்கின தூபி
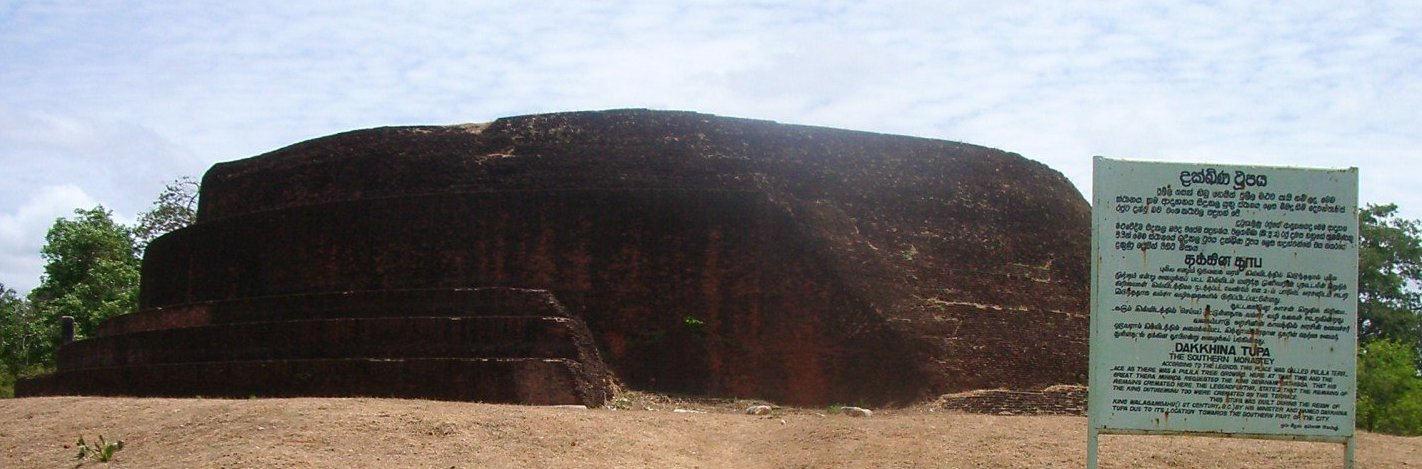
- The Stupa

- Location within Sri Lanka

Religion
- Affiliation: Buddhism
- District: Anuradhapura
- Province: North Central Province

Location
- Location: Anuradhapura
- Country: Sri Lanka
- Coordinates: 8°20′29.0″N 80°23′41.7″E

Architecture
- Type: Buddhist Temple
- Archaeological Protected Monument of Sri Lanka
- Designated

Dakkhina Stupa (Sinhala: දක්ඛිණ ස්තුපය, lit. 'Dakkhiṇa Stupaya', Tamil: தக்கின தூபி, lit. 'Dakkhiṇa Thupa') is a 2nd-century BC large brick Stupa in Anuradhapura, Sri Lanka. Earlier thought to be a monument of King Elara, it was later identified as the Stupa of ancient Dakini (Dakkhina) Vihara by Senarath Paranavithana with the help of a Brahmi inscription of the 3rd century A.D. unearthed from the ground between the southern and western Vahalkadas of the Stupa.

This structure was for centuries locally known as the tomb stone of king Ellalan, known as Elara Sohona, which was worshipped by Tamils and Sinhalese. However, after this monument was identified as the Dakkhina Stupa, Paranavitana pointed out that this site could mark the cremation ground of King Dutugamunu (161 BC – 137 BC). Although, some did not agree with this identification some are in the opinion that this Stupa may have been built over the cremation site of King Dutugemunu.

== History ==
According to the legends this site was known as the Pulila terrace as there was a growing Pulila tree at that time period and the thero, Mihindu had requested from the King Devanampiya Tissa (307 BC – 267 BC) to cremate his remains here. The legend further states that the remains of King Dutugamunu were also cremated in this terrace. It is said that this Stupa was constructed and named as Dhakkina thupa by a minister during the reign of King Valagamba (103 BCE and c. 89–77 BCE).

The structure was popularly known as Elara Sohona, the tomb of 2nd century BCE king Chola Tamil king Ellalan (c. 205 – c. 161 BC), who invaded Sri Lanka and ruled the Anuradhapura Kingdom for over 40 years. It was popularly believed that King Dutugemunu had built this for King Ellalan, after defeating him in battle. But in the mid-19th centuries James Fergusson a Scottish architect and writer who studied History of Indian and Eastern Architecture, had mentioned (1876) this structure could not be the Elara's tomb.

== See also ==
- Ancient stupas of Sri Lanka
