= Ellalan =

King of Anuradhapura from 205 to 161 BCE

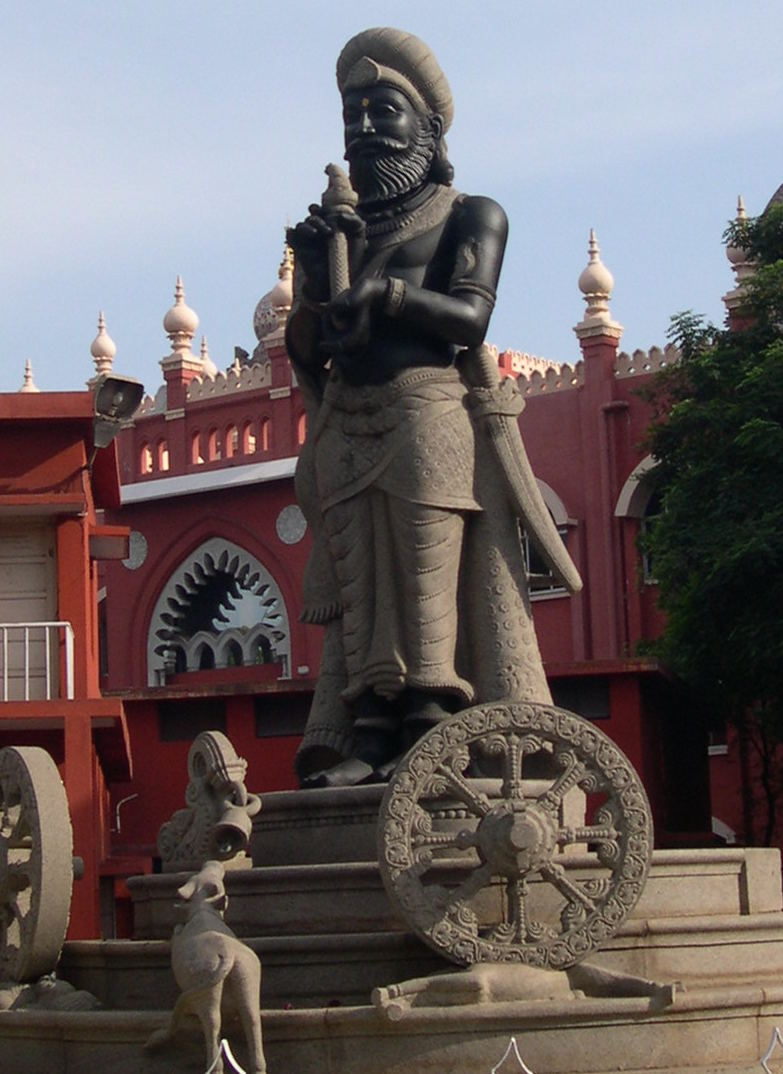
- Statue of Ellāḷaṉ in the premises of Madras High Court in Chennai

King of Anuradhapura
- Reign: c. 205 – c. 161 BCE
- Predecessor: Asela
- Successor: Dutugamunu
- Born: 235 BCE
- Died: 161 BCE (aged 73–74); Vijithapura, Kingdom of Anuradhapura
- Issue: Veedhividangan; Princess Shardha
- Dynasty: Chola
- Religion: Hinduism

Ellalan (Tamil: எல்லாளன், romanised: Ellāḷaṉ; Sinhala: එළාර, romanised: Eḷāra; 235–161 BCE), also referred to as Elara the Pious, and by the honorific epithet Manu Needhi Cholan, was a member of the Tamil Chola dynasty in Southern India, who upon capturing the throne became king of the Anuradhapura Kingdom, in present-day Sri Lanka, from 205 BCE to 161 BCE.

Ellalan is traditionally presented as being a just king even by the Sinhalese. The Mahavamsa states that he ruled 'with even justice toward friend and foe, on occasions of disputes at law', and elaborates how he even ordered the execution of his son for killing a calf under his chariot wheels.

Ellalan is a peculiar figure in the history of Sri Lanka. He is often regarded as one of Sri Lanka's wisest and most just monarchs, as highlighted in the ancient Sinhalese Pali chronicle, the Mahavamsa.

According to the chronicle, even Ellalan's nemesis Dutugamunu had a great respect for him, and ordered a monument be built where Ellalan was cremated after dying in battle. The Dakkhina Stupa was believed to be the tomb of Ellalan. Often referred to as 'the Just King', the Tamil name Ellāḷaṉ means 'the one who rules the boundary".

== Birth and early life ==
Ellalan is described in the Mahavamsa as being "A Damila of noble descent . . . from the Chola-country"; In that work, he is mentioned as Elara. Little is known of his early life. Around 205 BCE, Ellalan mounted an invasion of the Rajarata based in Anuradhapura in northern Sri Lanka and defeated the forces of king Asela of Anuradhapura and slayed the Asela of Anuradhapura, establishing himself as sole ruler of Rajarata. Ellalan's territory is said to have been to the north of the Mahaweli River

He has been mentioned in the Silappatikaram and Periya Puranam. His name has since then been used as a metaphor for fairness and justice in Tamil literature. His capital was Thiruvarur.

== Defeat and death ==
Despite Ellalan's famously even-handed rule, resistance to him coalesced around the figure of Dutugamunu, a young Sinhalese prince from the kingdom of Mahagama. Towards the end of Ellalan's reign, Dutugamunu had strengthened his position in the south by defeating his own brother, Saddha Tissa, who challenged him. Confrontation between the two monarchs was inevitable and the last years of Ellalan's reign were consumed by the war between the two. Ellalan was near seventy years when the battle with the young Dutugamunu took place.

The Mahavamsa contains a fairly detailed account of sieges and battles that took place during the conflict. Particularly interesting is the extensive use of war elephants and of flaming pitch in the battles. Ellalan's own war elephant is said to have been Maha Pabbatha, or 'Big Rock' and the Dutugamunu's own being 'Kandula'.

The climactic battle is said to have occurred as Dutugamunu drew close to Anuradhapura. On the night before, both King Ellalan and prince Dutugamunu are said to have conferred with their counsellors. The next day both kings rode forwards on war elephants, Ellalan "in full armour . . . with chariots, soldiers and beasts for riders". Dutugamunu's forces are said to have defeated those of Ellalan forces. Dutugamunu, declaring that 'none shall kill Ellalan but myself', closed on him at the south gate of Anuradhapura, where the two engaged in an elephant-back duel and the aged king was finally felled by one of Dutugamunu's darts.

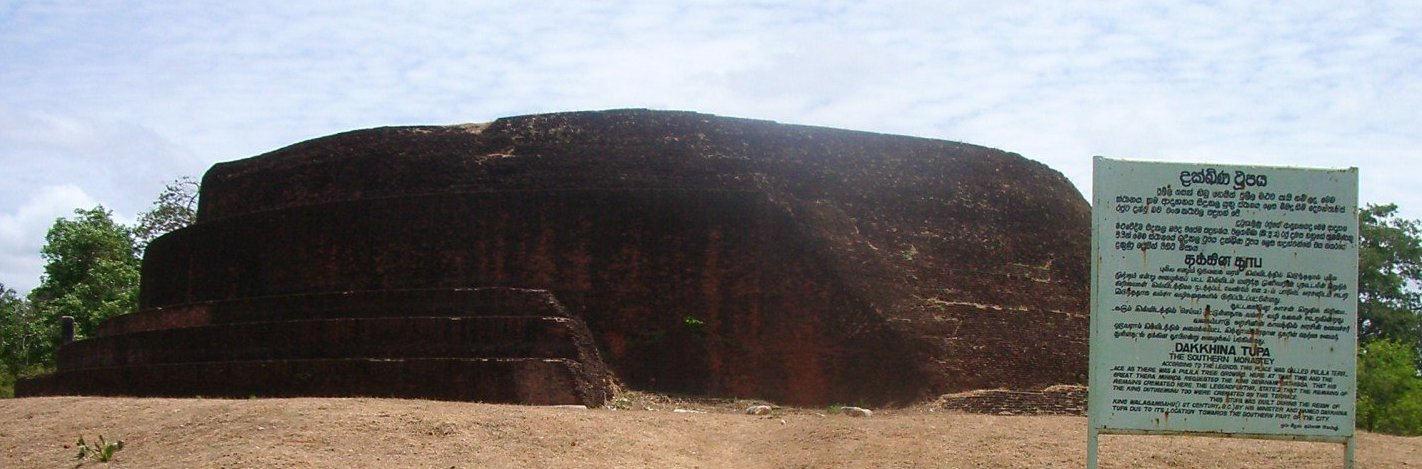
Until 19th century, the Dakkhina Stupa was believed to be the tomb of Ellalan

Following his death, Dutugamunu ordered that Ellāḷaṉ be cremated where he had fallen, and had a monument constructed over the place. The Mahavamsa mentions that 'even to this day the princes of Lanka, when they draw near to this place, are wont to silence their music'. The Dakkhina Stupa was until the 19th century believed to have been the tomb of Ellalan and was called Elara Sohona, but later it was identified as the Stupa of ancient Dakini (Dakkhina) Vihara by Senarath Paranavithana with the help of a Brahmi inscription of the 3rd century A.D. unearthed from the ground between the southern and western Vahalkadas of the Stupa. The identification and reclassification is considered controversial.

== Influence ==
The Mahavamsa contains numerous references to the loyal troops of the Chola empire and portrays them as a powerful force. They held various positions including taking custody of temples during the period of Parakramabahu I and Vijayabahu I of Polonnaruwa. There were instances when the Sinhalese kings tried to employ them as mercenaries by renaming a section of the most hardcore fighters as Mahatantra. According to historian Burton Stein, when these troops were directed against the Chola empire, they rebelled and were suppressed and decommissioned. But they continued to exist in a passive state by taking up various jobs for livelihood. The Valanjayara, a sub-section of the Velaikkara troops, were one such community, who in the course of time became traders. They were so powerful that the shrine of the tooth-relic was entrusted to their care. When the Velaikkara troops took custody of the tooth-relic shrine, they called it as Mūnrukai-tiruvēlaikkāran daladāy perumpalli. There are also multiple epigraphic records of the Velaikkara troops. It is their inscriptions, for example the one in Polunnaruwa, that are actually used to fix the length of the reign of Sinhalese kings; in this case, Vijayabahu I (55 years).

The Sri Lanka Navy Northern Naval Command base in Karainagar, Jaffna is named the SLNS Elara

== The Legend of Manu Needhi Cholan ==
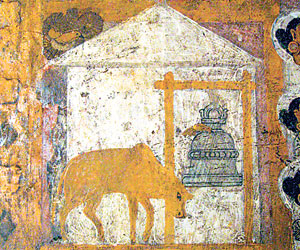
The cow is ringing the bell of Manu Needhi Cholan

Ellalan received the title "Manu Needhi Cholan" (the Chola who follows justice) because he executed his own son to provide justice to a cow. Legend has it that the king hung a giant bell in front of his courtroom for anyone needing justice to ring. One day, he came out on hearing the ringing of the bell by a cow. Upon enquiry, he found that the calf of that cow had been killed under the wheels of his son's chariot. In order to provide justice to the cow, Ellalan killed his own son, Veedhividangan, under the chariot as his own punishment i.e. Ellalan made himself suffer as much as the cow. Impressed by the justice of the king, Lord Shiva blessed him and brought back the calf and his son alive.

The Mahavamsa also states that when he was riding his cart he accidentally hit a Chetiya. After that he ordered his ministers to kill him but the ministers replied that Buddha would not approve such an act. The king asked what he should do to rectify the damage and they said that repairing the structure would be enough which is what he did.

Chronicles such as the Yalpana Vaipava Malai and stone inscriptions like Konesar Kalvettu recount that Kulakkottan, an early Chola king and descendant of Manu Needhi Cholan, was the restorer of the ruined Koneswaram temple and tank at Trincomalee in 438, the Munneswaram temple of the west coast, and as the royal who settled ancient Vanniyars in the east of the island Eelam.

== See also ==
- Tamil Nadu History
- History of Sri Lanka
- List of Tamil monarchs
- Chola Dynasty
- Chola Military
- Early Cholas

Ellalan Chola dynasty Born: ? 235 BC Died: ? 161 BC
Regnal titles
Preceded by Asela	King of Anuradhapura; 205 BC–161 BC	Succeeded by Dutthagamani
