= Maha Pambata =

Maha Pambata, or 'Big Rock' is a famous war elephant belonging to the Tamil King Ellalan (c.235 BCE - 161 BCE).

In Sri Lanka, it was not uncommon in antiquity for kings to use war elephants to lead their men personally into battle. Maha Pambata was King Elara's mount in his battle with King Dutugamunu, who rode the famous war elephant Kandula. The climactic battle between the two elephants and kings is said to have occurred as Dutugemunu drew close to Anuradhapura. The next day both kings rode forwards on their war elephants, Elara 'in full armour...with chariots, soldiers and beasts for riders'. Dutugemunu's forces are said to have routed those of Elara, with killing in such numbers that 'the water in the tank there was dyed red with the blood of the slain'. Dutugemunu, declaring that 'none shall kill Elara but myself', chased him to the south gate of Anuradhapura, where the two engaged in an elephant-back duel and the aged king was finally felled by one of Dutugemunu's darts. The fate of Maha Pambata is unknown.

== See also ==
- List of individual elephants
