= List of battles involving war elephants =

Some notable battles involving war elephants include:

- 331 BC, Battle of Gaugamela
- 326 BC, Battle of the Hydaspes River
- 319 BC, Battle of Cretopolis
- 318 BC, Siege of Megalopolis
- 317 BC, Battle of Paraitakene
- 316 BC, Battle of Gabiene
- 312 BC, Battle of Gaza
- 305-303 BC, Mauryan-Seleucid War
- 301 BC, Battle of Ipsus
- 280 BC, Battle of Heraclea
- 279 BC, Battle of Asculum
- 277 BC, Battle of Lysimachia
- 275 BC, Battle of Beneventum
- 274 BC, Battle of the Aous
- 272 BC, Siege of Sparta
- c. 275 BC, Battle of the Elephants
- 272 BC, Battle of Argos
- 265-264 BC, Kalinga War
- 262 BC, Siege of Agrigentum
- 255 BC, Battle of Tunis
- 251 BC, Battle of Panormus
- 238 BC, Battle of Utica
- 238 BC, Battle of "The Saw"
- 239 BC, Battle of the Bagradas River
- 219-218 BC, Siege of Saguntum
- 218 BC, Crossing of the Alps and the Battle of Trebia
- 217 BC, Battle of Raphia
- 207 BC, Battle of the Metaurus
- 202 BC, Battle of Zama
- 200 BC, Battle of Panium
- 197 BC, Battle of Cynoscephalae
- 190 BC, Battle of Magnesia
- 167-160 BC, Revolt of the Maccabees
- 164 BC, Battle of Beth-zur
- 153 BC, Roman siege of Numantia (Spain)
- 149-146 BC, Siege of Carthage
- 108 BC, Battle of the Muthul
- 46 BC, Battle of Thapsus
- 363, Battle of Samarra, other skirmishes between Shapur and Julian in his invasion of Persia
- 451, Battle of Vartanantz
- 634, Battle of the Bridge
- 636, Battle of al-Qādisiyyah
- 738, Caliphate campaigns in India
- 1040, Battle of Dandanaqan
- 1214, capture of Cremona by Frederick II, Holy Roman Emperor
- 1220, Siege of Samarkand
- 1277 After the battle of Ngasaunggyan, Kublai Khan captured his first war-elephants.
- 1398, Capture of Delhi
- 1402, Battle of Ankara, Timur's forces defeated Ottomans and Ottoman Civil War began
- 1511, Capture of Malacca (1511)
- 1526, First Battle of Panipat
- 1556, Second Battle of Panipat
- 1659, Battle of Khajwa
- 1739, Battle of Karnal
- 1761, Third Battle of Panipat
- 1825, Battle of Danubyu
