= Surus =

Hannibal's war elephant

- Species: Syrian elephant
- Occupation: War elephant
- Owner: Hannibal

Surus was believed to be the last war elephant of Carthaginian general Hannibal's army in Italy.

== History ==
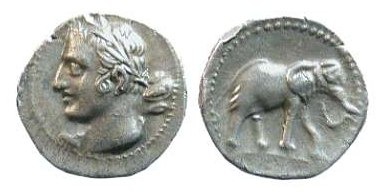
A Carthaginian coin found in Valls (Spain) depicting Hannibal and an elephant

Several Roman writers give accounts of Surus, a large elephant with a tusk broken. According to Plautus, Surus wore a red cloth, and may also have carried a red shield and a howdah (a construction on the animal's back), which served as a platform for Hannibal, who had difficulties overlooking the battlefield after losing one eye from an infection. According to some accounts, the animal was the last of the 37 war elephants Hannibal took with him on his 218 BC crossing of the Alps, during the Second Punic War.

Although a Carthaginian coin struck in the time of Hannibal depicts a North African elephant, historians believe Surus was a Western Asiatic or Syrian elephant descended from those seized by the Ptolemies of Egypt in the Syrian Wars, as its name, "Surus", would translate as "The Syrian". However, others have proposed it was a North African elephant like the rest of animals used by Carthage, interpreting the name as a nickname Romans would have given it for its broken tusk (surus or sudus being the name for a stake used in fortifications).

== See also ==
- List of individual elephants
