= Kandula (elephant) =

Sri Lankan war elephant

Kandula is a famous war elephant mentioned in the Sinhala chronicle Mahavamsa.

According to the chronicle, when Dutugamunu of Sri Lanka (101–77 BC) was born, many items of value were said to have appeared spontaneously, which were found and brought in by various people as gifts to the newborn. Among them a fine elephant who was found by a fisherman named Kandula. The elephant was named for its finder and became the companion of Dutugamunu, serving as his mount during the wars that led to the unification of Sri Lanka. The climactic duel between the Indian king Ellalan and Dutugemunu is said to have occurred near Anuradhapura where the two kings mounted on elephants; Dutugemunu mounting Kandula and Elara mounting Maha Pambata. King Ealara is said to have been slain in this elephant-mounted duel.

An Asian elephant born in 2001 at the National Zoo in Washington, D.C. was named after Kandula. He is the first Asian elephant to be conceived by artificial insemination and the 5th AI birth ever utilizing a method developed by a team of German veterinarians.

The mascot of the Sri Lanka Light Infantry Regiment is also named Kandula, after the royal elephant of Dutugamunu.

== See also ==
- List of individual elephants
