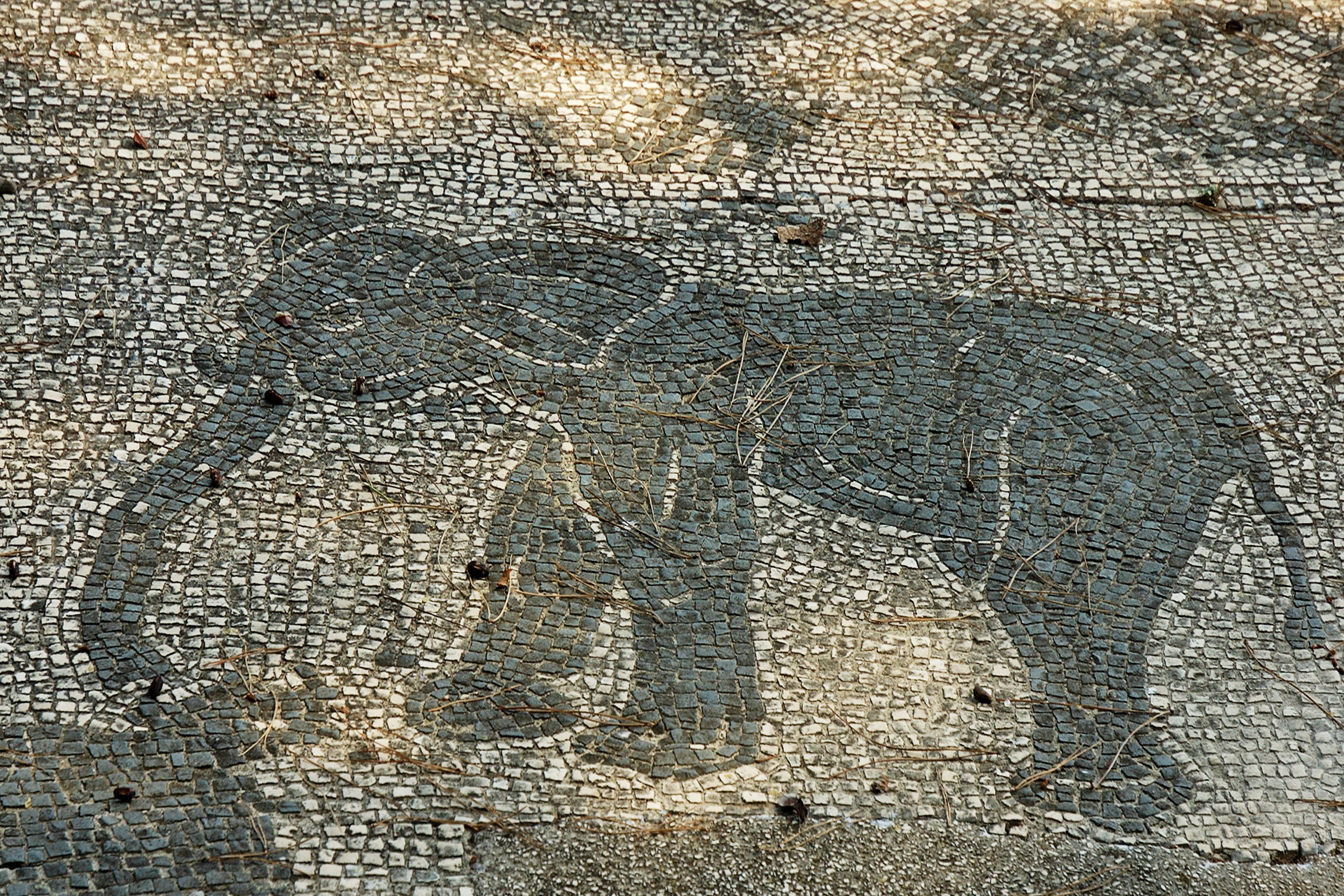
- Roman mosaic at Ostia Antica, Italy

Conservation status
- Extinct (c. 4th century AD.)

Scientific classification
- Kingdom: Animalia
- Phylum: Chordata
- Class: Mammalia
- Order: Proboscidea
- Family: Elephantidae
- Genus: Loxodonta
- Species: L. africana
- Subspecies: †L. a. pharaoensis

Trinomial name
- †Loxodonta africana pharaoensis Deraniyagala, 1948

Synonyms
- "L. a. berbericus" Seurat, 1930 (nomen nudum); "L. a. hannibaldi" Deraniyagala, 1953 (nomen nudum)

= North African elephant =

North African elephant Temporal range: Holocene 0.0117–0 Ma

Extinct subspecies of elephant

The North African elephant (Loxodonta africana pharaohensis) is an extinct subspecies of the African bush elephant (Loxodonta africana), or possibly a separate elephant species, that existed in North Africa, north of the Sahara, until it died out in Roman times. These were the famous war elephants used by Carthage in the Punic Wars, their conflict with the Roman Republic. Although the subspecies has been formally described, it has not been widely recognized by taxonomists. Other names for this animal include the North African forest elephant and Carthaginian elephant. Its natural range probably extended along the coast of the Red Sea, in what is now Egypt, Sudan, and Eritrea, but it may have extended further across northern Africa.

== Description ==
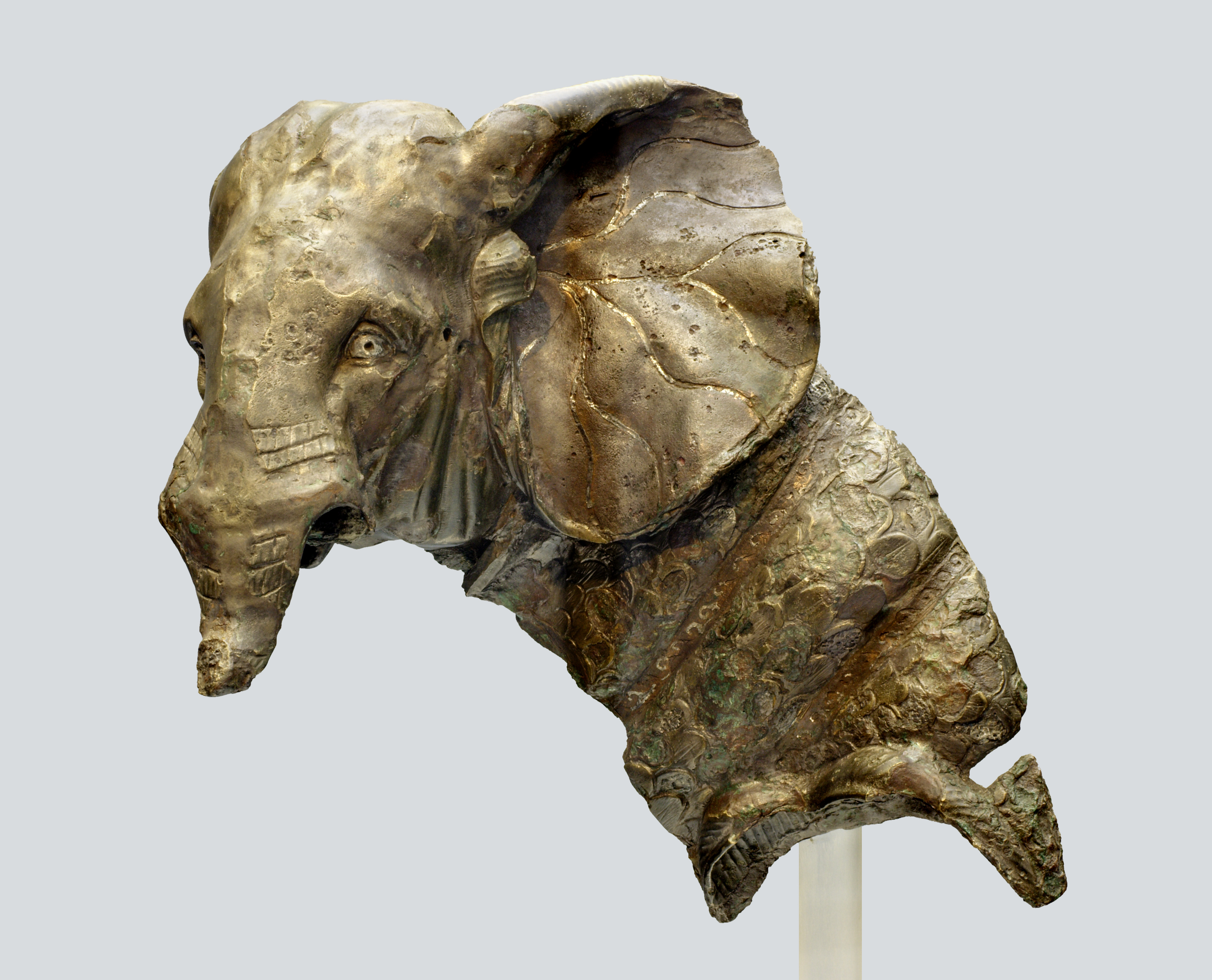
Roman bronze statue of a war elephant

Carthaginian frescoes and coins minted by whoever controlled North Africa at various times show very small elephants, perhaps 2.5 m (8 ft 2 in) at the shoulder, with the large ears and concave back typical of modern African elephants. Contemporary writers noted that the North African elephant was smaller than the Indian elephant. This suggests that the North African elephant was smaller than extant African bush elephants (L. a. africana), possibly similar in size to the modern African forest elephant (L. cyclotis).

== History ==
The North African elephant was a significant animal in Nubian culture. They were depicted on the walls of temples and on Meroitic lamps. Kushite kings also utilize war elephants, which are believed to have been kept and trained in the "Great Enclosure" at Musawwarat al-Sufa. The Kingdom of Kush provided these war elephants to the Egyptians, Ptolemies and Syrians.

After they conquered Sicily in 242 BC, the Romans tried to capture some specimens that had been left behind in the middle of the island by the Carthaginians, but failed in the endeavor. The elephants with which Hannibal crossed the Pyrenees and the Alps in order to invade Italy during the Second Punic War (218–201 BC) belonged to this group, with the possible exception of Hannibal's personal animal, Surus (meaning "the Syrian," or possibly "One-Tusker"). This individual, according to his documented name and large size, has been speculated to be a Syrian elephant (Elephas maximus asurus), which was a subspecies of the Asian elephant that became extinct shortly after Hannibal invaded Italy, but before the extinction of the North African elephant. However, little direct evidence suggests that this individual was necessarily an Asian elephant.

The North African elephant was also used by the Ptolemaic dynasty of Egypt. Writing in the 2nd century BC, Polybius (The Histories; 5.84) described their inferiority in battle against the larger Indian elephants used by the Seleucid kings. A surviving Ptolemaic inscription enumerates three types of war elephant: the "Troglodytic" (probably Libyan), the "Ethiopian", and the "Indian". The Ptolemaic king prides himself on being the first to tame the Ethiopian elephants, a stock which could be identical to one of the two extant African species.

During the reign of Augustus, about 3,500 elephants were killed in Roman circus games, and this prolonged use as a beast in games of baiting along with hunting would drive the species to extinction at the 4th century AD.

== Taxonomic uncertainty ==
Ansell (1971) classified L. a. pharaohensis as a distinct taxon of African elephant closely related to the African forest elephant. However, this has not been universally accepted. If not a distinct species or subspecies, the small size of the North African elephant could be explained by being a small population of African bush elephants, a population of African forest elephants, or by the capture and use of young African bush elephant individuals.

Given the relatively recent date of its disappearance, the status of this population can probably be resolved through ancient DNA sequence analyses, if specimens of definite North African origin can be located and examined. Remains dating to the time of the Roman Republic from Tetouan, Morocco, identified as those of an elephant by collagen fingerprinting, likely belong to this taxon.

== See also ==
- Syrian elephant
