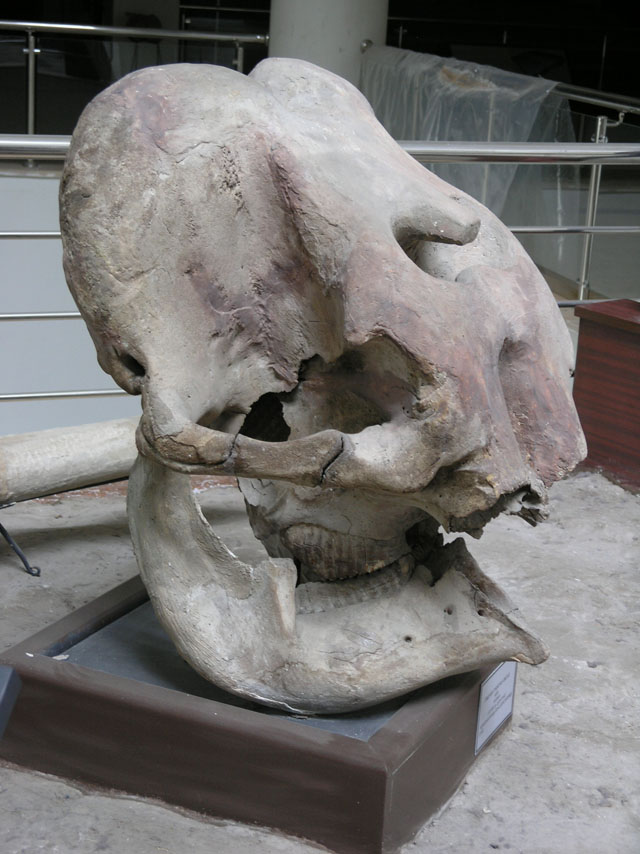
- Skull from Gavur Lake Swamp, Turkey

Scientific classification
- Kingdom: Animalia
- Phylum: Chordata
- Class: Mammalia
- Order: Proboscidea
- Family: Elephantidae
- Genus: Elephas
- Species: E. maximus
- Subspecies: †E. m. asurus

Trinomial name
- †Elephas maximus asurus Deraniyagala, 1950

= Syrian elephant =

Syrian elephant Temporal range: Holocene

Extinct subspecies of the Asian elephant

The Syrian or Western Asiatic elephant (sometimes given the subspecies designation Elephas maximus asurus) was the westernmost population of the Asian elephant (Elephas maximus), which went extinct in ancient times, with early human civilizations in the area utilizing the animals for their ivory, and possibly for warfare. Skeletal remains of E. m. asurus have been recorded in West Asia, notably from Iran, Iraq, Syria, and Turkey, from periods dating between at least 1800 BC and likely 700 BC. Due to the lack of any Late Pleistocene or early to mid-Holocene records for Asian elephants in the region, there are suggestions that the elephants were anthropogenically introduced, or transported, there during the Bronze Age, though this is disputed.

Ancient Syrian and Assyrian craftsmen used the tusks of E. m. asurus to make ivory carvings. Regionally, the production of ivory items was at its height during the first millennium, BC, when the Arameans crafted splendid ivory inlays for elite furniture.

== Taxonomy and description ==
The subspecies Elephas maximus asurus was named by Sri Lankan paleontologist Paulus Edward Pieris Deraniyagala in 1950. Later authors have questioned the subspecies designation, stating that Deraniyagala's description was based on "doubtful interpretation of Bronze Age illustrations". Deraniyagala argued that the subspecies was large in size in comparison to other Asian elephant populations, but this was made based on only a few bone measurements.

A study of mitochondrial DNA from 3500 year old remains from Gavur Lake Swamp southwest of Kahramanmaraş in Turkey, which represent an apparently wild-living population (that may or may not have ultimately originated from human-introduced elephants), found that they were within extant genetic variation and belonged to the β1 subclade of the major β clade of Asian elephants, β1 being the predominant clade among Indian elephants. These elephant were found to carry an extremely rare mitochondrial haplotype only previously found in a single modern elephant in Thailand. The origin of the haplotype has been placed between 3,700 and 58,700 years ago, with a mean estimate of 23,500 years ago, suggesting that the population did not descend from Middle Pleistocene Elephas fossils known from the region. If the population was not introduced by humans, it must have arrived in the region as an expansion from the core range of the Asian elephant during the Late Pleistocene or Holocene. The data are inconclusive as to whether the population has an anthropogenic origin.

== Distribution and chronology ==
Remains of Asian elephants in Bronze age and Early Iron Age West Asia are known spanning across Mesopotamia, southeast Turkey and the northern Levant, spanning from Haft Tepe in Khuzestan, southwest Iran, across Iraq, and northern Syria eastwards to Ugarit, northwards to Arslantepe and eastwards to Sirkeli in southeast Turkey, and south-westwards to Kamid el-Loz in southern Lebanon. Most of these finds are in an archaeological context, and only two sites show apparent wild-living elephants, Gavur Lake Swamp in southwest Turkey and Lake Habbaniyah in central Iraq.

No remains of the Elephas genus are known from West Asia after 200,000 years ago until 3,500 years ago. This long hiatus makes some scholars suspect that the Asian elephants were artificial introductions to West Asia, possibly from India, though this is difficult to prove. The extinction date is suggested to be around 700 BC, based on osteoarchaeological and historical evidence. This was possibly due to climactic shifts and changing land use during the early Iron Age.

== Later presence of Asian elephants in West Asia ==
Elephants are frequently mentioned in Hellenistic history; the Seleucid kings, who maintained numerous war elephants, reigned in Syria during that period. These elephants are believed to be Indian elephants (E. m. indicus), which had been acquired by the Seleucid kings during their eastern expansions; or they are believed to be a population of Indian elephants in West Asia. It is attested by ancient sources such as Strabo and Polybius that Seleucid kings Seleucus I Nicator and Antiochus III the Great had large numbers of imported Indian elephants.

Hannibal had a war elephant known as "Surus", which may have meant "the Syrian". It was said by Cato to have been his best and largest elephant, which may have been an Asian elephant. Carthaginians may have used Asian elephants of Indian origin for part of their army.

== See also ==
- North African elephant, a subspecies of African elephant that became extinct around 400 AD.
- Persian war elephants
