= War elephant =

Military use of elephants for combat

War elephants depicted in Hannibal crossing the Rhône (1878), by Henri Motte

A war elephant is an elephant that is trained and guided by humans for combat purposes. Historically, the war elephant's main use was to charge the enemy, break their ranks, and instill terror and fear. Elephantry, or elephant cavalry, is the name for specific military units using elephant-mounted troops.These elephants weighed roughly between 3500kg and 5000kg.

War elephants played a critical role in several key battles in antiquity, especially in ancient India. While seeing limited and periodic use in Ancient China, they became a permanent fixture in armies of historical kingdoms in Southeast Asia. They were also used in ancient Persia and in the Mediterranean world within armies of Macedon, Hellenistic Greek states, the Roman Republic and later Empire, and Ancient Carthage in North Africa. In some regions they maintained a firm presence on the battlefield throughout the Medieval era. However, their use declined with the spread of firearms and other gunpowder weaponry in early modern warfare. After this, war elephants became restricted to non-combat engineering and labour roles, as well as minor ceremonial uses.

== Antiquity ==
=== Indian subcontinent ===
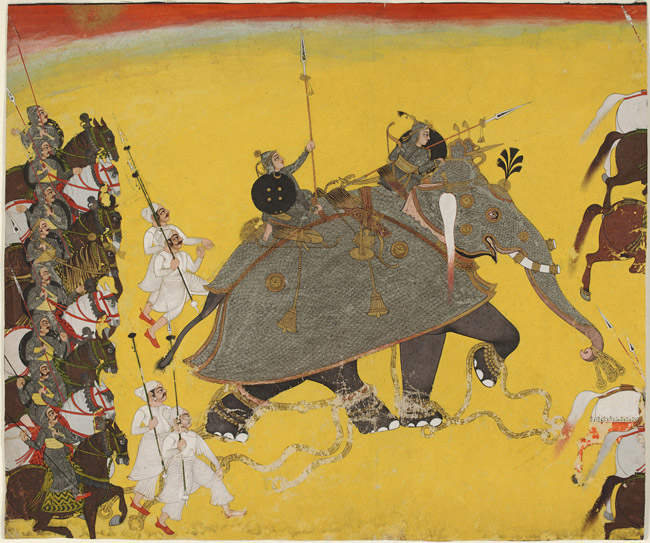
Rajput painting depicting a war elephant in an army

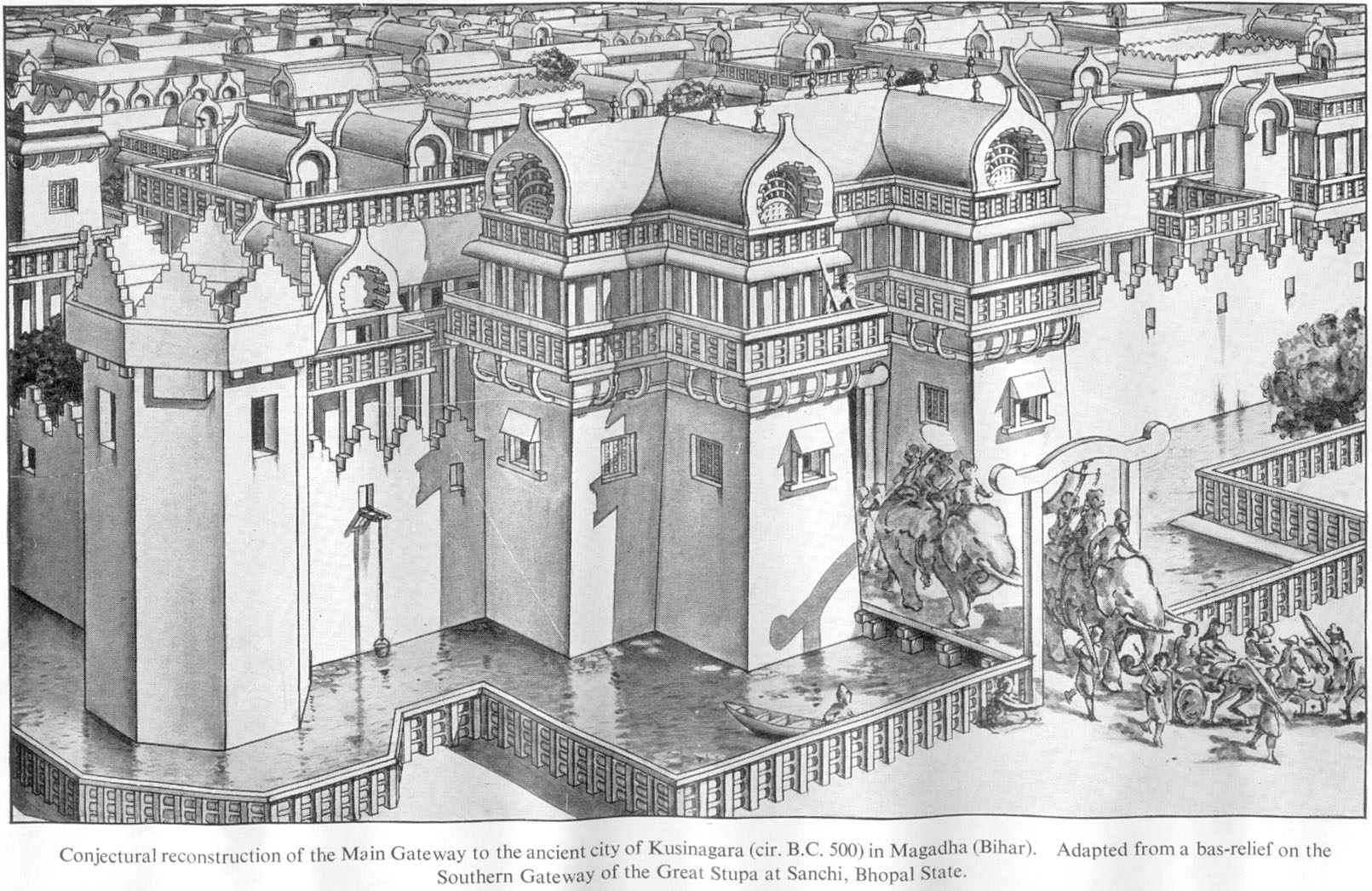
Conjectural reconstruction of the main gate of Kusinagara used by war elephants c. 500 BC adapted from a relief at Sanchi.

There is uncertainty as to when elephant warfare first started, but it is widely accepted that it began in ancient India. The early Vedic period did not extensively specify the use of elephants in war. However, in the Ramayana, Indra is depicted as riding either Airavata, a mythological elephant, or on the Uchchaihshravas, as his mounts. Elephants were widely utilized in warfare by the later Vedic period by the 6th century BC. The increased conscription of elephants in the military history of India coincides with the expansion of the Vedic Kingdoms into the Indo-Gangetic Plain suggesting its introduction during the intervening period. The practice of riding on elephants in peace and war, royalty or commoner, was first recorded in the 6th or 5th century BC. This practice is believed to be much older than proper recorded history. Elephants were also used against Alexander the Great's army in India.

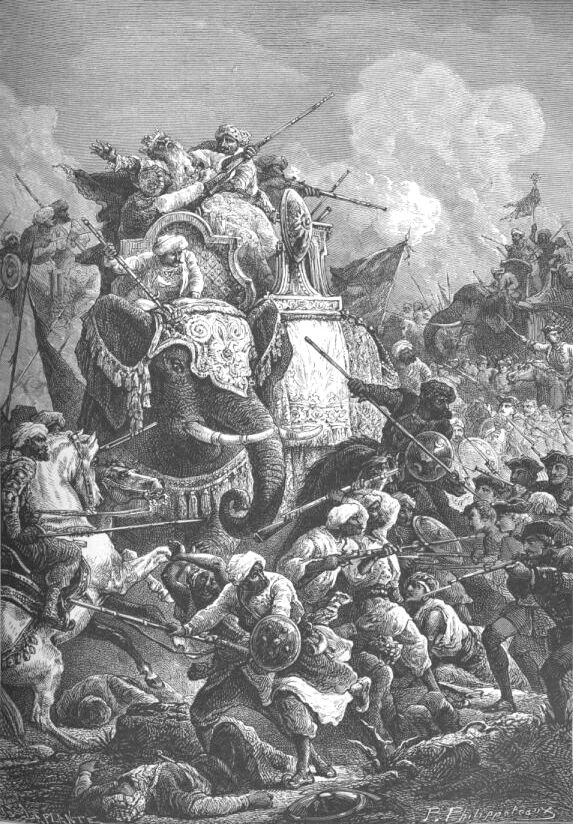
War elephants in battle during the Carnatic Wars

The ancient Indian epics Ramayana and Mahābhārata, dating from 5th–4th century BC, elaborately depict elephant warfare. They are recognized as an essential component of royal and military processions. In ancient India, initially, the army was fourfold (chaturanga), consisting of infantry, cavalry, elephants and chariots. Kings and princes principally rode on chariots, which were considered the most royal, while seldom riding on the backs of elephants. Although viewed as secondary to chariots by royalty, elephants were the preferred vehicle of warriors, especially the elite ones. While the chariots eventually fell into disuse, the other three arms continued to be valued. Many characters in the epic Mahābhārata were trained in the art. According to the rules of engagement set for the Kurukshetra War, two men were to duel utilizing the same weapon and mount, including elephants. In the Mahābhārata the akshauhini battle formation consists of a ratio of 1 chariot : 1 elephant : 3 cavalry : 5 infantry soldiers. Many characters in the Mahābhārata were described as skilled in the art of elephant warfare e.g. Duryodhana rides an elephant into battle to bolster the demoralized Kaurava army. Scriptures like the Nikāya and Vinaya Pitaka assign elephants in their proper place in the organization of an army. The Samyutta Nikaya additionally mentions the Gautama Buddha being visited by a 'hatthāroho gāmaṇi'. He is the head of a village community bound together by their profession as mercenary soldiers forming an elephant corp.

Ancient Indian kings certainly valued the elephant in war, some stating that an army without elephants is as despicable as a forest without a lion, a kingdom without a king, or as valor unaided by weapons. The use of elephants further increased with the rise of the Mahajanapadas. King Bimbisara (c. 543 BC), who began the expansion of the Magadha kingdom, relied heavily on his war elephants. The Mahajanapadas would be conquered by the Nanda Empire under the reign of Mahapadma Nanda. According to Curtius, Alexander learned that the Nanda had 200,000 infantry; 20,000 cavalry; 3,000 elephants; and 2,000 four-horse chariots. Diodorus gives the number of elephants as 4,000. Plutarch inflates these numbers significantly, except the infantry: according to him, the Nanda force included 200,000 infantry; 80,000 cavalry; 6,000 elephants; and 8,000 chariots. It is possible that the numbers reported to Alexander had been exaggerated by the local Indian population, who had the incentive to mislead the invaders. Alexander the Great would come in contact with the Nanda Empire on the banks of the Beas River and was forced to return due to his army's unwillingness to advance. Even if historic accounts exaggerated the numbers and prowess of these elephants, elephants were firmly established as war machines in this period.

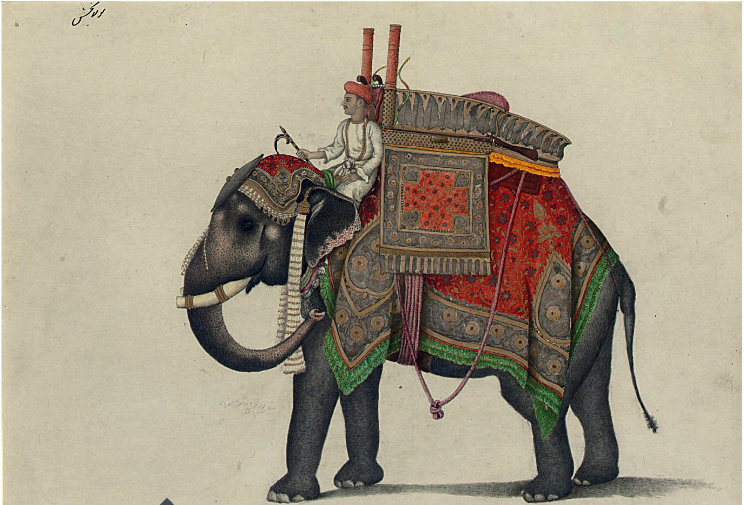
This elephant and driver with a hunting howdah, including pistol, bows and a rifle.

At the height of his power, Chandragupta Maurya of the Maurya Empire is said to have wielded a military of 600,000 infantry, 30,000 cavalry, 8,000 chariots and 9,000 war elephants besides followers and attendants. In the Mauryan Empire, the 30-member war office was made up of six boards. The sixth board looked after the elephants, and was headed by a Gajadhyaksha, or superintendent of elephants, who was tasked with their training. The use of elephants in the Maurya Empire is recorded by Chanakya in the Arthashastra. According to Chanakya, catching, training, and controlling war elephants were among the most important skills taught by military academies. He advised Chandragupta to set up forested sanctuaries for the wellness of the elephants. Chanakya explicitly conveyed the importance of these sanctuaries. The Maurya Empire would reach its zenith under the reign of Ashoka, who used elephants extensively during his conquest. During the Kalinga War, Kalinga had a standing army of 60,000 infantry, 1000 cavalry and 700 war elephants. Kalinga was notable for the quality of its war elephants, which its neighbors prized for their strength. Later the King Kharavela was to restore an independent Kalinga into a powerful kingdom using war elephants as stated in the Hathigumpha inscription or "Elephant Cave" Inscriptions. Following Indian accounts, foreign rulers would also adopt the use of elephants.

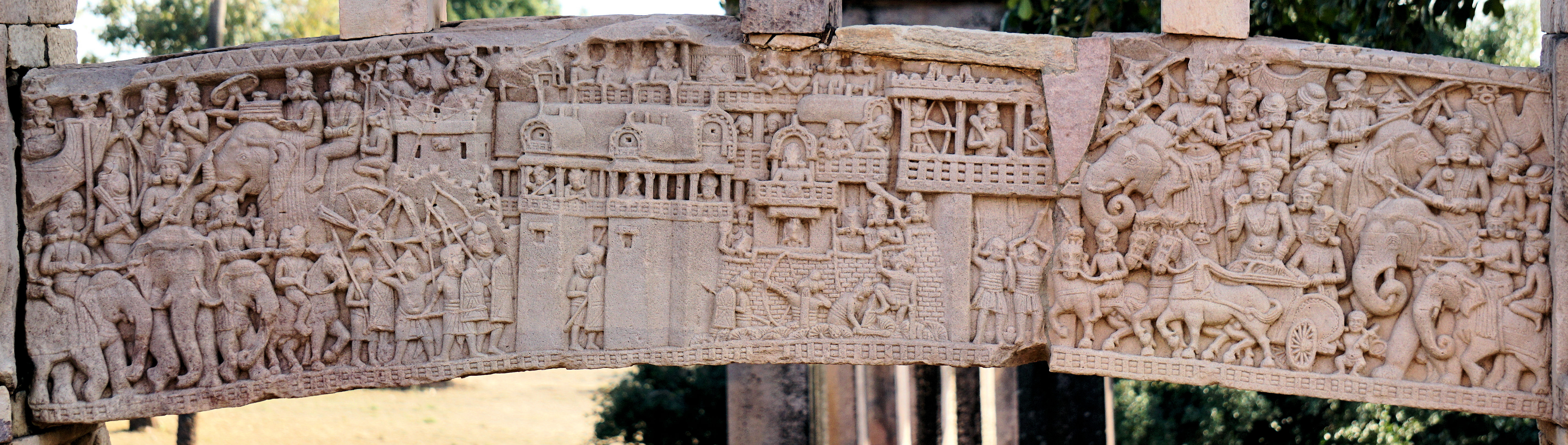
Mallakas defending the city of Kusinagara with war elephants, as depicted at Sanchi, 1st century BCE.

The Chola Empire of Tamil Nadu also had a very strong elephant force. The Chola emperor Rajendra Chola had an armored elephant force, which played a major role in his campaigns.

Sri Lanka made extensive use of elephants and also exported elephants with Pliny the Elder stating that the Sri Lankan elephants, for example, were larger, fiercer and better for war than local elephants. This superiority, as well as the proximity of the supply to seaports, made Sri Lanka's elephants a lucrative trading commodity. Sri Lankan history records indicate elephants were used as mounts for kings leading their men in the battlefield, with individual mounts being recorded in history. The elephant Kandula was King Dutugamunu's mount and Maha Pambata, 'Big Rock', the mount of King Ellalan during their historic encounter on the battlefield in 200 BC, for example.

=== Eastern Asia ===
Elephants were used for warfare in China by a small handful of southern dynasties. The state of Chu used elephants in 506 BC against Wu by tying torches to their tails and sending them into the ranks of the enemy soldiers, but the attempt failed. In December 554 AD, the Liang dynasty used armoured war elephants, carrying towers, against Western Wei. They were defeated by a volley of arrows. The Southern Han dynasty is the only state in Chinese history to have kept a permanent corps of war elephants. These elephants were able to carry a tower with some ten people on their backs. They were used successfully during the Han invasion of Ma Chu in 948. In 970, the Song dynasty invaded Southern Han and their crossbowmen readily routed the Han elephants on 23 January 971, during the taking of Shao. That was the last time elephants were used in Chinese warfare, although the Wanli Emperor (r. 1572–1620) did keep a herd of elephants capable of carrying a tower and eight men. These elephants were probably not native to China and were delivered to the Ming dynasty by Southeast Asian countries such as Siam. During the Revolt of the Three Feudatories, the rebels used elephants against the Qing dynasty, but the Qing Bannermen shot them with so many arrows that they "resembled porcupines" and repelled the elephant charge.

... the soldiers of the first column were attacked by the elephants. The flags of Major-general of the Guards, Walda of the Yellow Banner, and of Lieutenant Ulehi of the Manchu-Mongol cavalry were captured. As the elephants closed in on the encircled soldiers of the second column, the arrows shot by all of my men [into the elephants’ hides] looked like the quills of a porcupine. The elephants fled towards the hills [but] I was greatly alarmed and had a strange feeling. The rebels withdrew from the plain and split into groups [to hide] in the thick forest of the mountain.

— Dzengseo

Chinese armies faced off against war elephants in Southeast Asia, such as during the Sui–Lâm Ấp war (605), Lý–Song War (1075–1077), Ming–Mong Mao War (1386–1388), and Ming–Hồ War (1406–1407). In 605, the Champa kingdom of Lâm Ấp in what is now southern Vietnam used elephants against the invading army of China's Sui dynasty. The Sui army dug pits and lured the elephants into them and shot them with crossbows, causing the elephants to turn back and trample their own army. In 1075, the Song defeated elephants deployed on the borderlands of Đại Việt during the Lý–Song War. The Song forces used scythed polearms to cut the elephants' trunks, causing them to trample their own troops. During the Mong Mao campaign, the elephants were routed by an assortment of gunpowder projectiles. In the war against the Hồ dynasty, Ming troops covered their horses with lion masks to scare the elephants and shot them with firearms. The elephants all trembled with fear and were wounded by the guns and arrows, causing the Viet army to panic.

=== Achaemenid Persia, Macedonia and Hellenistic Greek states ===
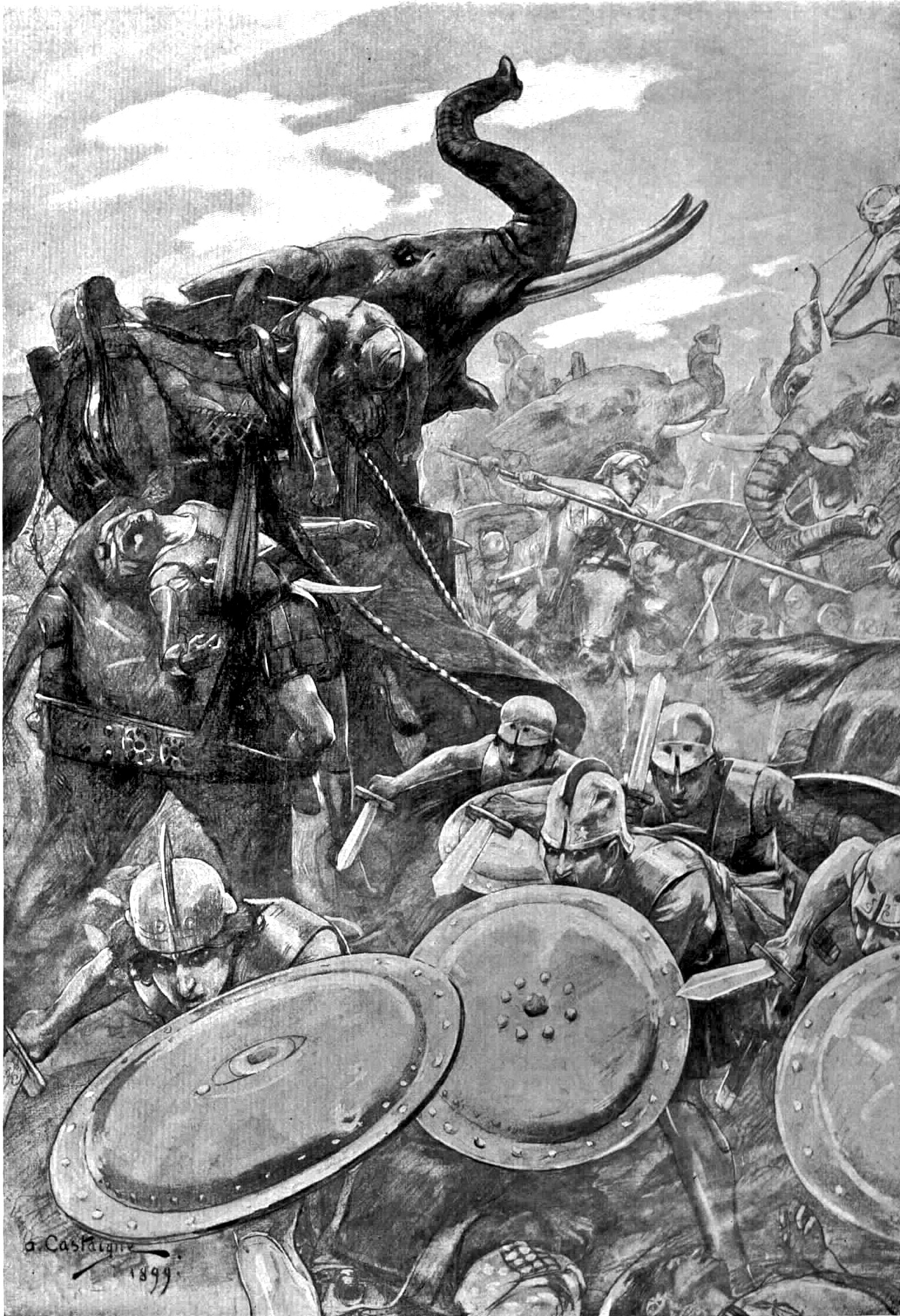
A depiction of war elephants attacking at the Battle of the Hydaspes River, by Andre Castaigne

From India, military thinking on the use of war elephants spread westwards to the Achaemenid Empire, where they were used in several campaigns. They in turn came to influence the campaigns of Alexander the Great, king of Macedonia in Hellenistic Greece. The first confrontation between Europeans and the Persian war elephants occurred at Alexander's Battle of Gaugamela (331 BC), where the Persians deployed fifteen elephants. These elephants were placed at the centre of the Persian line and made such an impression on Alexander's army that he felt the need to sacrifice to Phobos, the God of Fear, the night before the battle – but according to some sources the elephants ultimately failed to deploy in the final battle owing to their long march the day before. Alexander was deeply impressed by the enemy elephants and took these first fifteen into his own army, adding to their number during his capture of the rest of Persia.

By the time Alexander reached the borders of India five years later, he had a substantial number of elephants under his own command. When it came to defeating Porus, who ruled in what is now Punjab region, Alexander found himself facing a force of between 85 and 100 war elephants at the Battle of the Hydaspes. Preferring stealth and mobility to sheer force, Alexander manoeuvered and engaged with just his infantry and cavalry, ultimately defeating Porus' forces, including his elephant corps, albeit at some cost. Porus for his part placed his elephants individually, at long intervals from each other, a short distance in front of his main infantry line, in order to scare off Macedonian cavalry attacks and aid his own infantry in their struggle against the phalanx. The elephants caused many losses with their tusks fitted with iron spikes or by lifting the enemies with their trunks and trampling them. Arrian described the subsequent fight: "[W]herever the beasts could wheel around, they rushed forth against the ranks of infantry and demolished the phalanx of the Macedonians, dense as it was."

The Macedonians adopted the standard ancient tactic for fighting elephants, loosening their ranks to allow the elephants to pass through and assailing them with javelins as they tried to wheel around; they managed to pierce the unarmoured elephants' legs. The panicked and wounded elephants turned on the Indians themselves; the mahouts were armed with poisoned rods to kill the beasts but were slain by javelins and archers.

Looking further east again, Alexander could see that the emperors and kings of the Nanda Empire and Gangaridai could deploy between 3,000 and 6,000 war elephants. Such a force was many times larger than the number of elephants employed by the Persians and Greeks, which probably discouraged Alexander's army and effectively halted their advance into India. On his return, Alexander established a force of elephants to guard his palace at Babylon, and created the post of elephantarch to lead his elephant units.

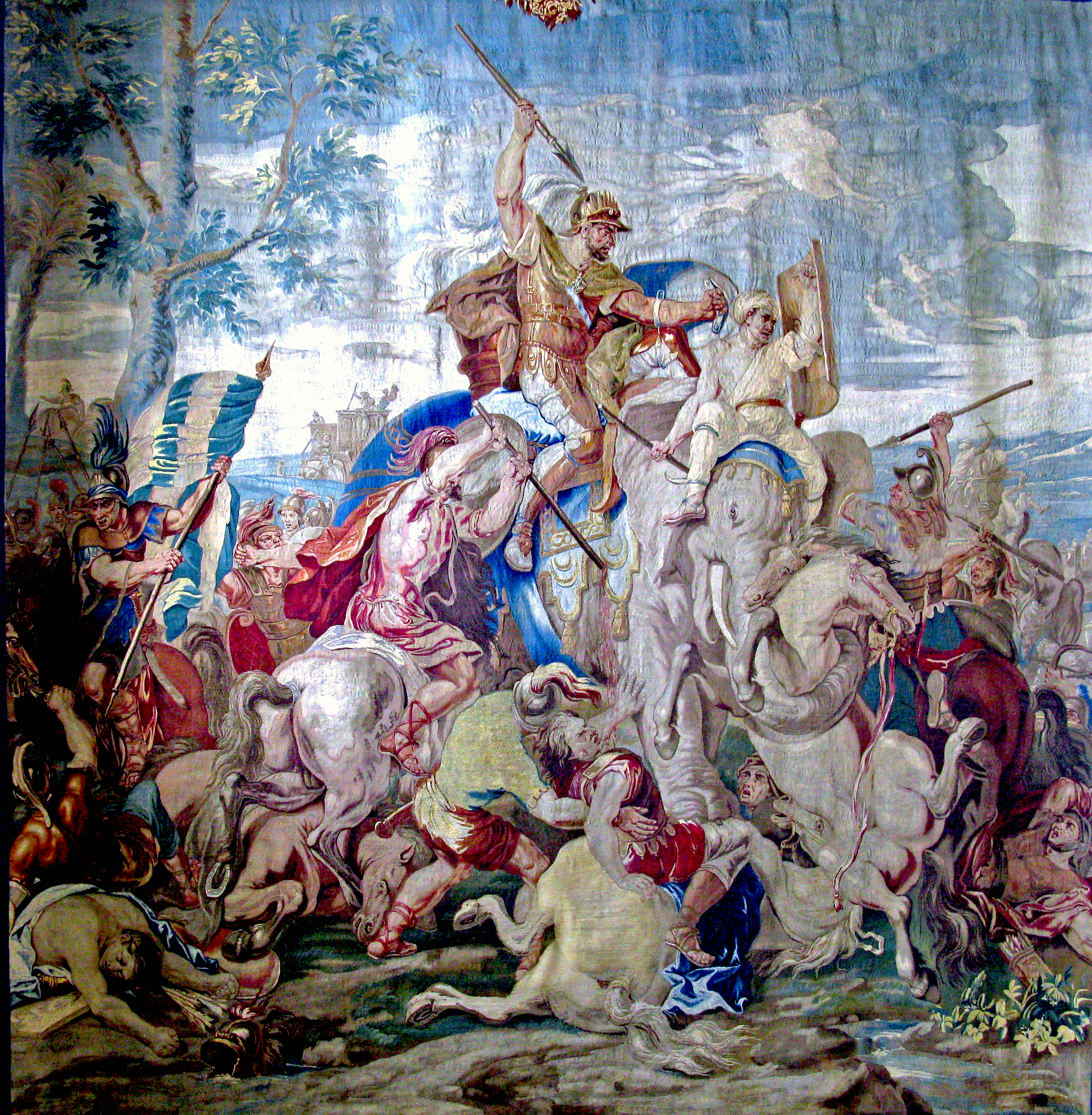
War elephants during the Battle of Gaugamela

The successful military use of elephants spread further. The successors to Alexander's empire, the Diadochi, used hundreds of Indian elephants in their wars, with the Seleucid Empire being particularly notable for their use of the animals, still being largely brought from India. Indeed, the Seleucid–Mauryan war of 305–303 BC ended with the Seleucids ceding vast eastern territories in exchange for 500 war elephants – a small part of the Mauryan forces, which included up to 9000 elephants by some accounts. The Seleucids put their new elephants to good use at the Battle of Ipsus four years later, where they blocked the return of the victorious Antigonid cavalry, allowing the latter's phalanx to be isolated and defeated.

The first use of war elephants in Europe was made in 318 BC by Polyperchon, one of Alexander's generals, when he besieged Megalopolis in the Peloponnesus during the wars of the Diadochi. He used 60 elephants brought from Asia with their mahouts. A veteran of Alexander's army, named Damis, helped the besieged Megalopolitians to defend themselves against the elephants and eventually Polyperchon was defeated. Those elephants were subsequently taken by Cassander and transported, partly by sea, to other battlefields in Greece. It is assumed that Cassander constructed the first elephant transport sea vessels. Some of the elephants died of starvation in 316 BC in the besieged city of Pydna in Macedonia. Others of Polyperchon's elephants were used in various parts of Greece by Cassander.

Although the use of war elephants in the western Mediterranean is most famously associated with the wars between Carthage and Roman Republic, the introduction of war elephants was primarily the result of an invasion by Hellenistic era Epirus across the Adriatic Sea. King Pyrrhus of Epirus brought twenty elephants to attack Roman Italy at the battle of Heraclea in 280 BC, leaving fifty additional animals, on loan from Ptolemaic Pharaoh Ptolemy II, on the mainland. The Romans were unprepared for fighting elephants, and the Epirot forces routed the Romans. The next year, the Epirots again deployed a similar force of elephants, attacking the Romans at the battle of Asculum. This time the Romans came prepared with flammable weapons and anti-elephant devices: ox-drawn wagons, equipped with long spikes to wound the elephants, pots of fire to scare them, and accompanying screening troops who would hurl javelins at the elephants to drive them away. A final charge of Epirot elephants won the day, but this time Pyrrhus had suffered very heavy casualties.

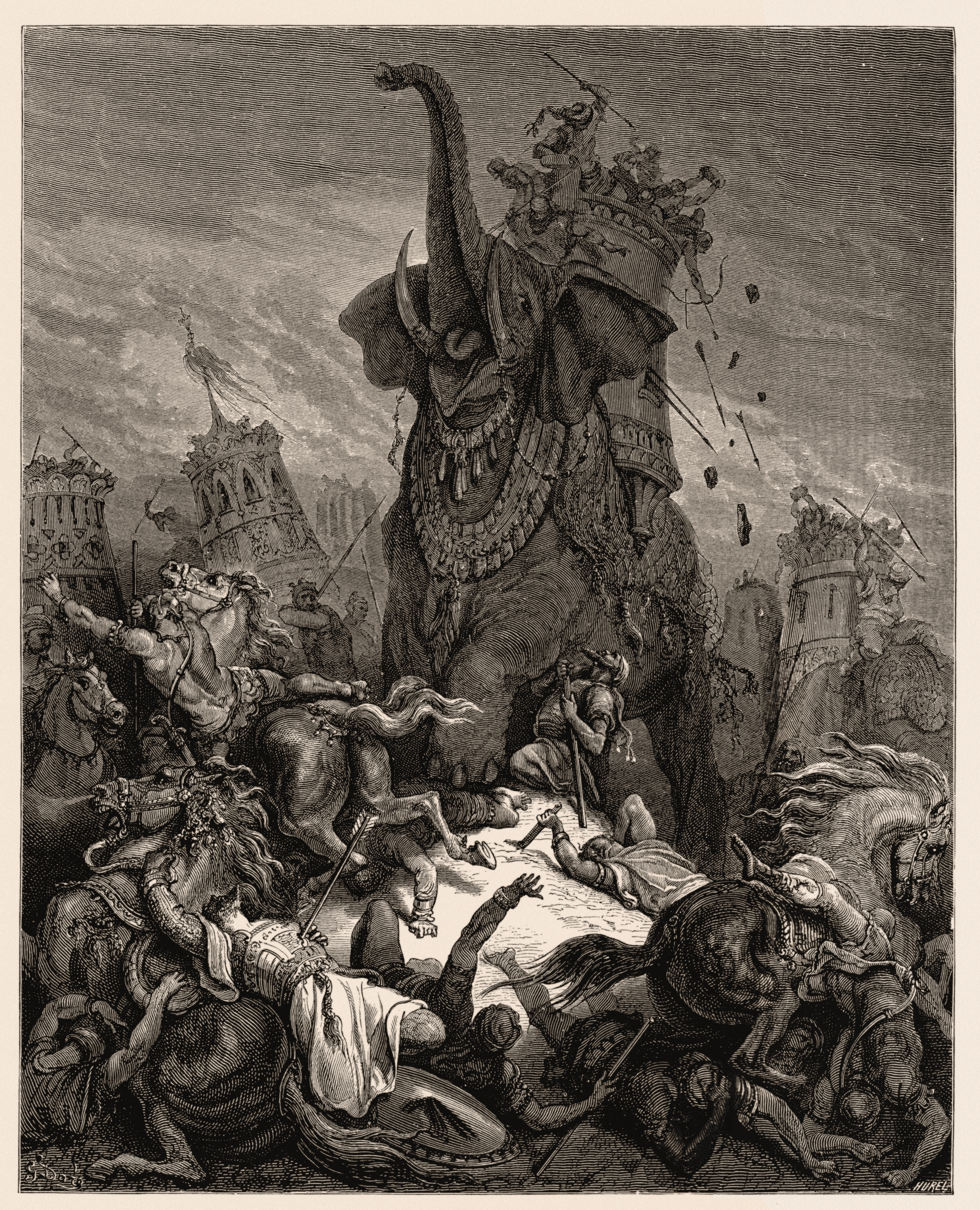
Eleazar trampled by a war elephant during the Battle of Beth Zechariah, 162 BCE. Drawing by Gustave Doré

The Seleucid king Antiochus V Eupator, whose father and he contended with Ptolemaic Egypt's ruler Ptolemy VI for control of Syria, invaded Judea in 161 BCE with eighty elephants (some sources claim thirty-two), some of which were clad in armoured breastplates, in an attempt to subdue the Jews who had revolted during the Maccabean Revolt.

=== North Africa ===
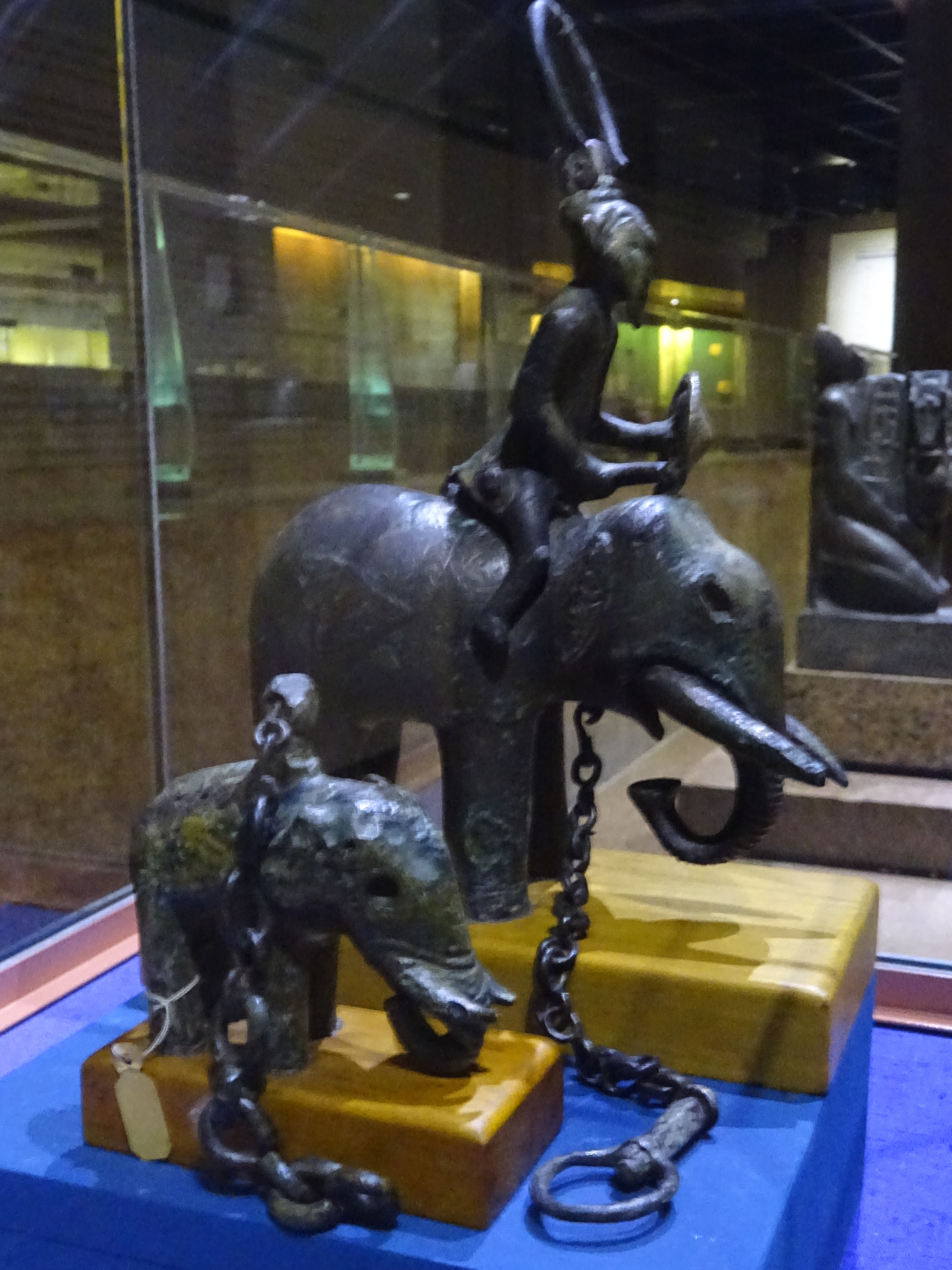
Mounted Nubian elephant

The North African elephant was a significant animal in Nubian culture. They were depicted on the walls of temples and on Meroitic lamps. Kushite kings also utilize war elephants, which are believed to have been kept and trained in the "Great Enclosure" at Musawwarat al-Sufa. The Kingdom of Kush provided these war elephants to the Egyptians, Ptolemies and Syrians.

The Ptolemaic Egypt and the Punics began acquiring African elephants for the same purpose, as did Numidia and the Kingdom of Kush. The animal used was the North African elephant (Loxodonta africana pharaohensis) which would become extinct from overexploitation. These animals were smaller and harder to tame, and could not swim deep rivers compared with the Asian elephants used by the Seleucid Empire, particularly Syrian elephants. It is likely that at least some Syrian elephants were traded abroad. The favourite, and perhaps last surviving, elephant of Hannibal's crossing of the Alps was an animal named Surus ("the Syrian"), which may have been of Syrian stock, though the evidence remains ambiguous.

Since the late 1940s, a strand of scholarship has argued that the African forest elephants used by Numidia, the Ptolemies and the military of Carthage did not carry howdahs or turrets in combat, perhaps owing to the physical weakness of the species. Some allusions to turrets in ancient literature are certainly anachronistic or poetic invention, but other references are less easily discounted. There is contemporary testimony that the army of Juba I of Numidia included turreted elephants in 46 BC. This is backed by the image of a turreted African elephant used on the coinage of Juba II. This also appears to be the case with Ptolemaic armies: Polybius reports that at the battle of Raphia in 217 BC the elephants of Ptolemy IV carried turrets; these elephants were significantly smaller than the Asian elephants fielded by the Seleucids. There is also evidence that Carthaginian war elephants were furnished with turrets and howdahs in certain military contexts.

Farther south, tribes would have had access to the African savanna elephant (Loxodonta africana oxyotis). Although much larger than either the African forest elephant or the Asian elephant, these proved difficult to tame for war purposes and were not used extensively. Asian elephants were traded westwards to the Mediterranean markets, with Sri Lankan elephants being particularly preferred for war.

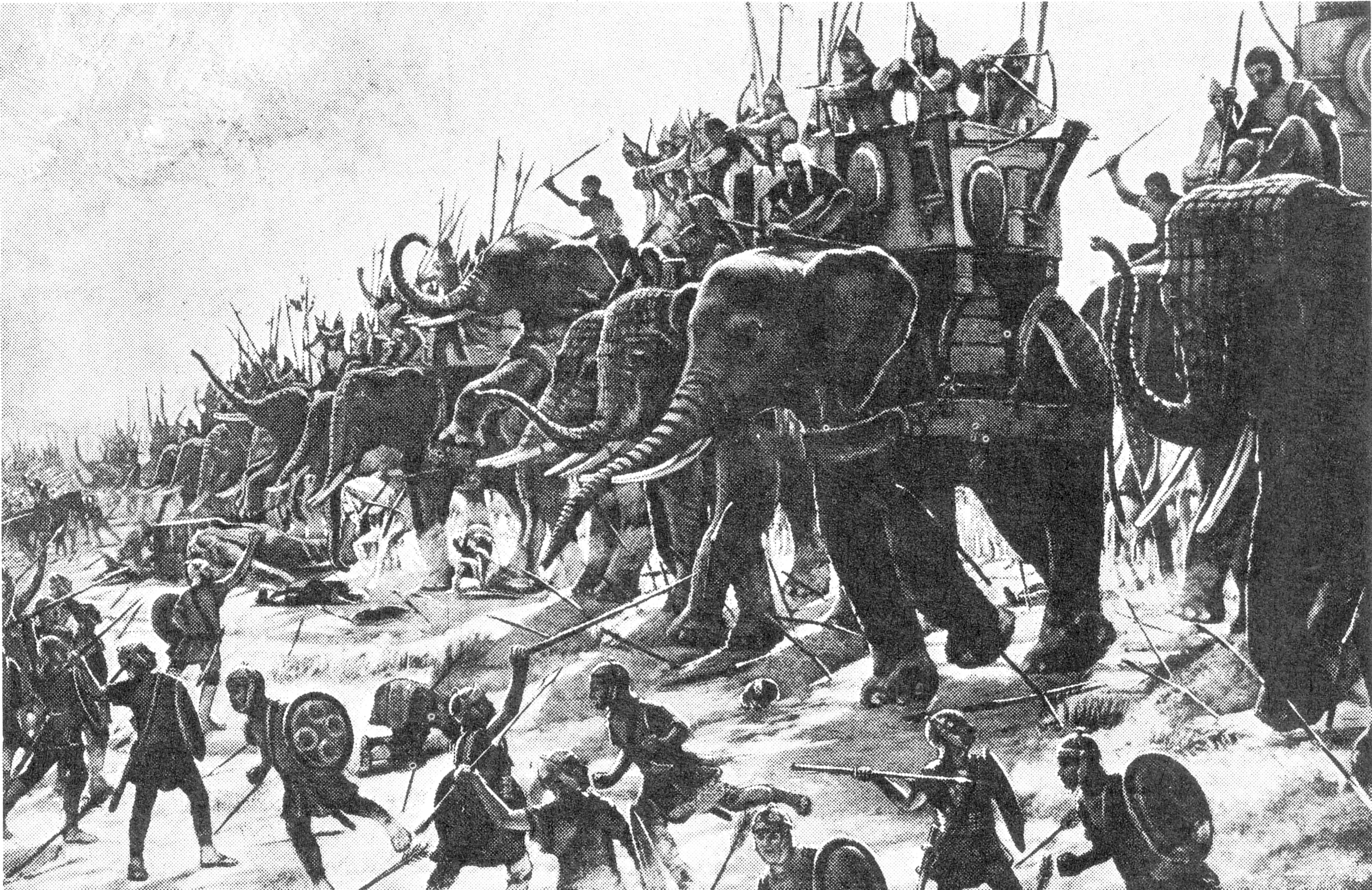
Battle of Zama by Henri-Paul Motte, 1890

Perhaps inspired by the victories of Pyrrhus of Epirus, Carthage developed its own use of war elephants and deployed them extensively during the First and Second Punic Wars. The performance of the Carthaginian elephant corps was mixed, illustrating the need for proper tactics to take advantage of the elephant's strength and cover its weaknesses. At Adyss in 255 BC, the Carthaginian elephants were ineffective due to the terrain, while at the battle of Panormus in 251 BC the Romans' velites were able to terrify the Carthaginian elephants being used unsupported, which fled from the field. At the battle of Tunis the charge of the Carthaginian elephants helped to disorder the Roman legions, allowing the Carthaginian phalanx to stand fast and defeat them. During the Second Punic War, Hannibal led an army of war elephants across the Alps. Many of them perished in the harsh conditions but the surviving elephants were successfully used in the battle of Trebia, where they panicked the Roman cavalry and Gallic allies. The Romans eventually developed effective anti-elephant tactics, leading to Hannibal's defeat at his final battle of Zama in 202 BC; his elephant charge, unlike the one at the battle of Tunis, was ineffective because the disciplined Roman maniples made way for them to pass.

=== Rome ===
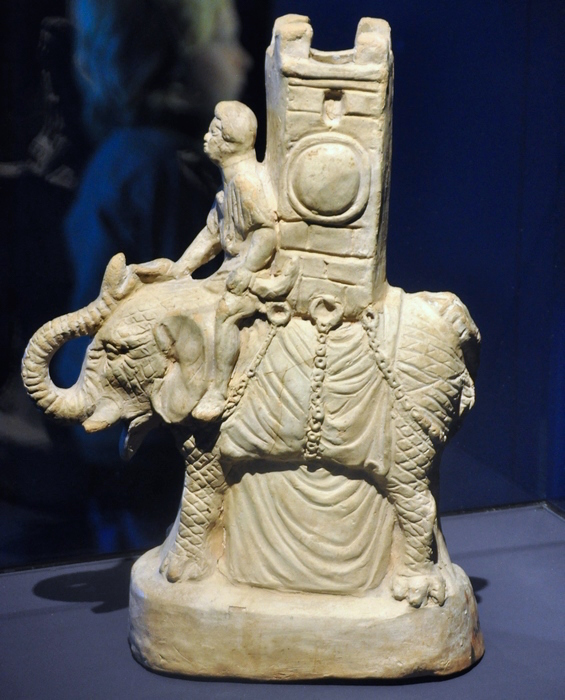
Statuette of an Asian war elephant, Pompeii

Rome brought back many elephants at the end of the Punic Wars, and used them in its campaigns for many years afterwards. The conquest of Greece saw many battles in which the Romans deployed war elephants, including the invasion of Macedonia in 199 BC, the battle of Cynoscephalae 197 BC, the battle of Thermopylae, and the battle of Magnesia in 190 BC, during which Antiochus III's fifty-four elephants took on the Roman force of sixteen. In later years the Romans deployed twenty-two elephants at Pydna in 168 BC. The role of the elephant force at Cynoscephalae was particularly decisive, as their quick charge shattered the unformed Macedonian left wing, allowing the Romans to encircle and destroy the victorious Macedonian right. A similar event also occurred at Pydna. The Romans' successful use of war elephants against the Macedonians might be considered ironic, given that it was Pyrrhus who first taught them the military potential of elephants.

Elephants also featured throughout the Roman campaign against the Lusitanians and Celtiberians in Hispania. During the Second Celtiberian War, Quintus Fulvius Nobilior was helped by ten elephants sent by king Masinissa of Numidia. He deployed them against the Celtiberian forces of Numantia, but a falling stone hit one of the elephants, which panicked and frightened the rest, turning them against the Roman forces. After the subsequent Celtiberian counterattack, the Romans were forced to withdraw. Later, Quintus Fabius Maximus Servilianus marched against Viriathus with another ten elephants sent by king Micipsa. However, the Lusitanian style of ambushes in narrow terrains ensured his elephants did not play an important factor in the conflict, and Servilianus was eventually defeated by Viriathus in the city of Erisana.

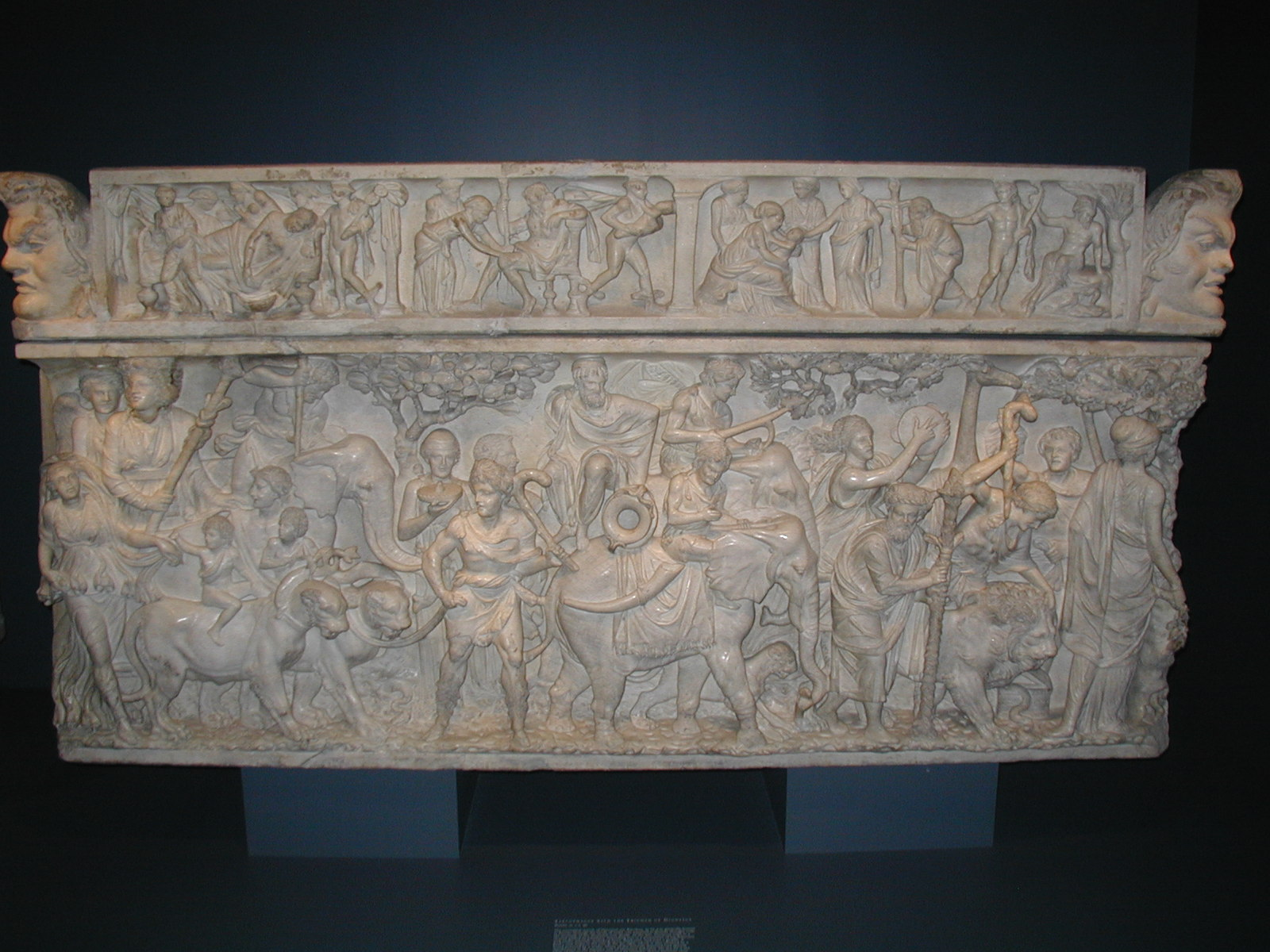
Roman marble sarcophagus depicting the Triumph of Bacchus returning from India, with soldiers atop war elephants, 2nd century AD, similar to a later sarcophagus with the same theme

The Romans used a war elephant in their first invasion of Britain, one ancient writer recording that "Caesar had one large elephant, which was equipped with armour and carried archers and slingers in its tower. When this unknown creature entered the river, the Britons and their horses fled and the Roman army crossed over" – although he may have confused this incident with the use of a war elephant in Claudius' final conquest of Britain. At least one elephant skeleton with flint weapons found in England was initially misidentified as one of these elephants, but later dating proved it to be a mammoth skeleton from the Stone Age.

In the African campaign of the Roman civil war of 49–45 BC, the army of Metellus Scipio used elephants against Caesar's army at the battle of Thapsus. Scipio trained his elephants before the battle by aligning the elephants in front of slingers that would throw rocks at them, and another line of slingers at the elephants' rear to perform the same, in order to propel the elephants only in one direction, preventing them turning their backs because of frontal attack and charging against his own lines, but the author of De Bello Africano admits of the enormous effort and time required to accomplish this.

By the time of Claudius, such animals were being used by the Romans in single numbers only – the last significant use of war elephants in the Mediterranean was against the Romans at the battle of Thapsus, 46 BC, where Julius Caesar armed his fifth legion (Alaudae) with axes and commanded his legionaries to strike at the elephant's legs. The legion withstood the charge, and the elephant became its symbol. The remainder of the elephants seemed to have been thrown into panic by Caesar's archers and slingers.

=== Parthia and Sassanian Persia ===
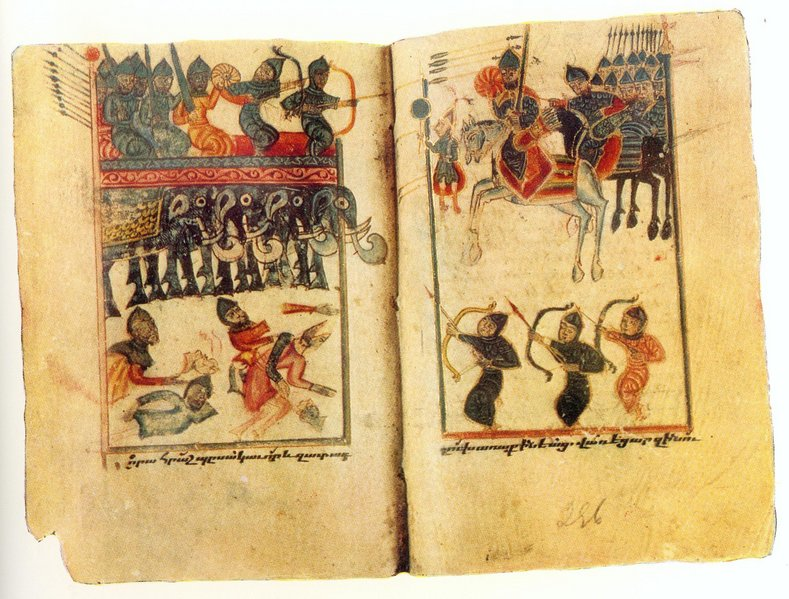
A 15th-century Armenian miniature representing the Sassanid Persians War elephants in the Battle of Avarayr (451 CE)

The Parthian Empire occasionally used war elephants in their battles against the Roman Empire, but elephants were of substantial importance in the army of the subsequent Sassanid Empire. The Sasanian war elephants are recorded in engagements against the Romans, such as during Julian's invasion of Persia. Other examples include the Battle of Vartanantz in 451 AD, at which the Sassanid elephants terrified the Armenians, and the Battle of al-Qādisiyyah of 636 AD, in which a unit of thirty-three elephants was used against the invading Arab Muslims.

The Sassanid elephant corps held primacy amongst the Sassanid cavalry forces and was recruited from India. The elephant corps was under a special chief, known as the Zend−hapet, meaning "Commander of the Indians", either because the animals came from that country, or because they were managed by natives of Hindustan. The Sassanid elephant corps was never on the same scale as others further east, and after the fall of the Sassanid Empire the use of war elephants died out in the region.

=== Aksumite Empire ===
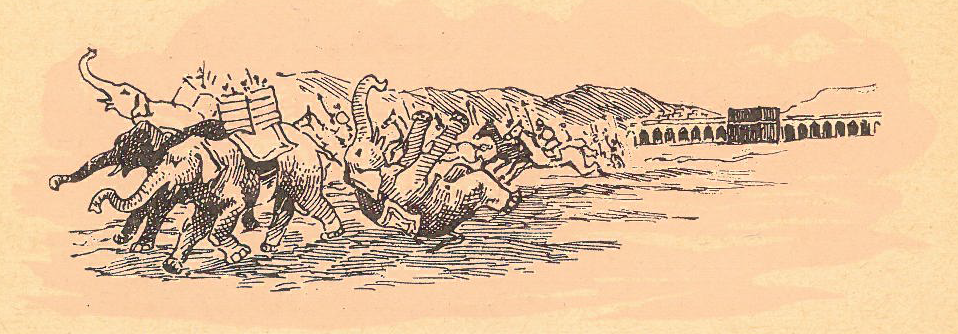
Abyssinian rout at Mecca in the Year of the Elephant, as depicted in Tareekh Al-Islam Al-Musawwar (1964)

The Kingdom of Aksum in what is now Ethiopia and Eritrea made use of war elephants in 525 AD during the invasion of the Himyarite Kingdom in the Arabian peninsula. The war elephants used by the Aksumite army consisted of African savannah elephants, a significantly larger and more temperamental species of elephant. War elephants were again put to use by an Aksumite army in 570 in a military expedition against the Quraysh of Mecca.

== Middle Ages ==
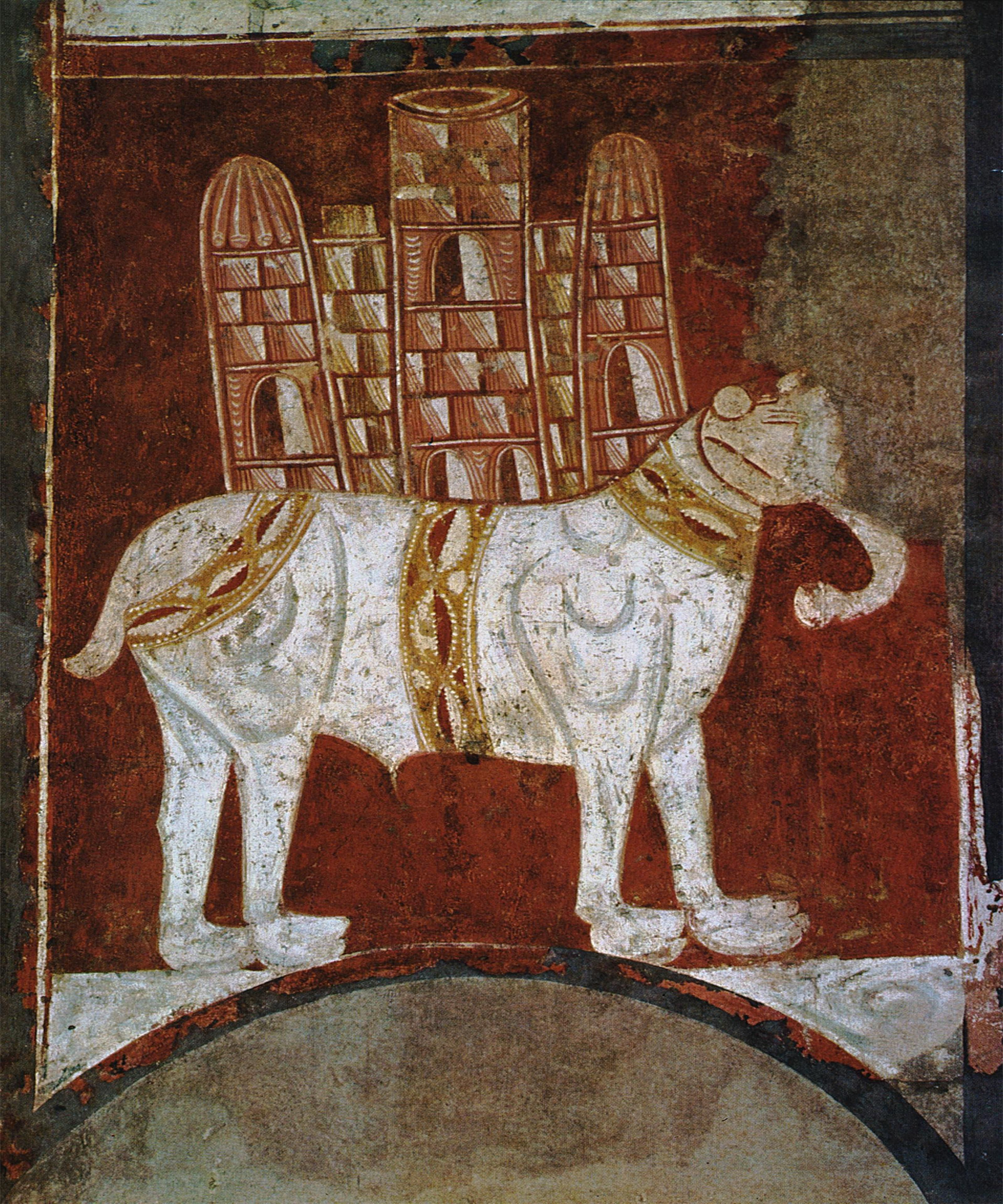
A Romanesque painting of a war elephant. Spain, 11th century

=== Early Medieval India ===
The Kushan Empire conquered most of Northern India. The empire adopted war elephants when levying troops as they expanded into the Indian subcontinent. The Weilüe describes how the population of Eastern India rode elephants into battle, but currently they provide military service and taxes to the Yuezhi (Kushans). The Hou Hanshu additionally describes the Kushan as acquiring riches including elephants as part of their conquests. The emperor Kanishka assembled a great army from his subject nations, including elephants from India. He planned on attacking the Tarim Kingdoms, and sent a vanguard of Indian troops led by white elephants. However, when crossing the Pamir Mountains the elephants and horses in the vanguard were unwilling to advance. Kanishka is then said to have had a religious revelation and rejected violence.

The Gupta Empire demonstrated extensive use of elephants in war and greatly expanded under the reign of Samudragupta. Local squads which each consisted of one elephant, one chariot, three armed cavalrymen, and five foot soldiers protected Gupta villages from raids and revolts. In times of war, the squads joined to form a powerful imperial army. The Gupta Empire employed 'Mahapilupati', a position as an officer in charge of elephants. Emperors such as Kumaragupta struck coins depicted as elephant riders and lion slayers.

Harsha established hegemony over most of North India. The Harshacharita composed by Bāṇabhaṭṭa describes the army under the rule of Harsha. Much like the Gupta Empire, his military consisted of infantry, cavalry, and elephants. Harsha received war elephants as tribute and presents from vassals. Some elephants were also obtained by forest rangers from the jungles. Elephants were additionally taken from defeated armies. Bana additionally details the diet of the elephants, recording that they each consumed 600 pounds (270 kg) of fodder consisting of trees with mangos and sugarcanes.

The Chola dynasty and the Western Chalukya Empire maintained a large number of war elephants in the 11th and 12th century. The war elephants of the Chola dynasty carried on their backs fighting towers which were filled with soldiers who would shoot arrows at long range. The army of the Pala Empire was noted for its huge elephant corps, with estimates ranging from 5,000 to 50,000.

=== Islamic world ===
In Islamic history there is a significant event known as the ‘Am al-Fil (Arabic: عَـام الـفـيـل, "Year of the Elephant"), approximately equating to 570 AD. At that time Abraha, the Christian ruler of Yemen, marched upon the Ka‘bah in Mecca, intending to demolish it. He had a large army, which included one or more elephants (as many as eight, in some accounts). However, the (single or lead) elephant, whose name was 'Mahmud', is said to have stopped at the boundary around Mecca, and refused to enter – which was taken by both the Meccans and their Yemenite foes as a serious omen. According to Islamic tradition, it was in this year that Muhammad was born.

After their encounter with the Sassanian war elephants, the Muslims did not utilise them again in war for the next few centuries. Instead they were relegated to diplomatic gifts or the parading of prominent prisoners of war during a victory parade. It was not until the 11th century Ghaznavids that elephants were utilised in war once again, and this was to be on a huge scale.

The Ghaznavids acquired their elephants as tribute from the Hindu princes and as war plunder. The sources usually list the number of beasts captured, and these frequently ran into hundreds, such as 350 from Qanauj and 185 from Mahaban in 409/1018-19, and 580 from the Raja Ganda in 410/1019-20. Utbi records that the Thanesar expedition of 405/1014-15 was provoked by Mahmad's desire to get some of the special breed of Sri Lankan breed of elephants excellent in war. The huge size of the Ghaznavid elephant corps is shown by the review of 1023, featuring 1,300 armoured war elephants, increasing further to 1,670 by 1031. This armour consisted of iron helmets and scale body armour of either cork or iron, and were equipped with Tusk knives. Neither the plains of Iran, nor the mountains of Afghanistan could provide enough food to sustain the elephants, so they would periodically sojourn in India to regain their weight. Their importance in the Ghaznavid military is shown by an elephant keeper having the same rank as a general.

Their use in 1008 against the Kara-Khanid invasion of Khorasan is perhaps the only ever recorded instance of war elephants being used in deep snow (since the Battle of the Trebia only had light snow). Later in 1025 Mahmud used 400 elephants against Ali-Tegin. However, in 1040, these heavy war elephants proved to be a disadvantage at the battle of Dandanqan where the Ghaznavids were bested by Seljuk mobility. At the Battle of Ghazni (1117) 50 Ghaznavid elephants initially scared off the Seljuk cavalry, until they managed to wound the lead elephant causing the rout of the whole Ghaznavid army. Though the Seljuks too adopted them, and 18 war elephants proved pivotal for Ahmed Sanjar's victory at the battle of Saveh a year later in late 1118.

In the Middle Ages, elephants were seldom used in Europe. Charlemagne took his one elephant gifted to him by Harun al-Rashid, Abul-Abbas, when he went to fight the Danes in 804, and the Crusades gave Holy Roman Emperor Frederick II the opportunity to capture an elephant in the Holy Land, the same animal later being used in the capture of Cremona in 1214, but the use of these individual animals was more symbolic than practical, especially when contrasting food and water consumption of elephants in foreign lands and the harsh conditions of the crusades.

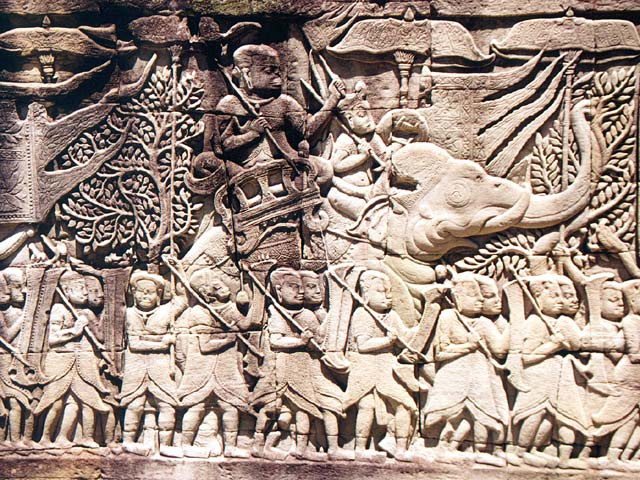
The Khmer army waged war with elephants against the Cham in the 12th century.

The Mongols faced war-elephants in Khorazm, Burma, Siam, Vietnam, Cambodia and India throughout the 13th century. Despite their unsuccessful campaigns in Vietnam and India, the Mongols defeated the war elephants outside Samarkand by using catapults and mangonels, and during the Mongol invasions of Burma in 1277–1287 and 1300–1302 by showering arrows from their famous composite bows. Genghis and Kublai both retained captured elephants as part of their entourage.

=== Later Medieval India ===
The Delhi Sultanate boasted a large elephant corps, with 2,700 war elephants partaking in the defence against the Mongol invasion of India (1297–1298), though usually only 1,000 elephants were trained for war. They also made developments to elephant armour, such as side flaps for ear protection and a spike to their helmets. However, after many years of decline and civil war, the Sultans of Delhi could only field 120 elephants upon Timur's invasion a century later. In the Sack of Delhi, Timur's army outnumbered the Indians 3–1, yet they almost lost because of the fear they elephants caused amongst his troops. Historical accounts say that the Timurids ultimately won by employing an ingenious strategy: Timur tied flaming straw to the back of his camels before the charge. The smoke made the camels run forward, scaring the elephants, who crushed their own troops in their efforts to retreat. Another account of the campaign by Ahmad ibn Arabshah reports that Timur used oversized caltrops to halt the elephants' charge. Later, the Timurid leader used the captured animals himself in his western campaigns. First at the siege of Damascus (1400) and at the Battle of Ankara against the Ottoman Empire.

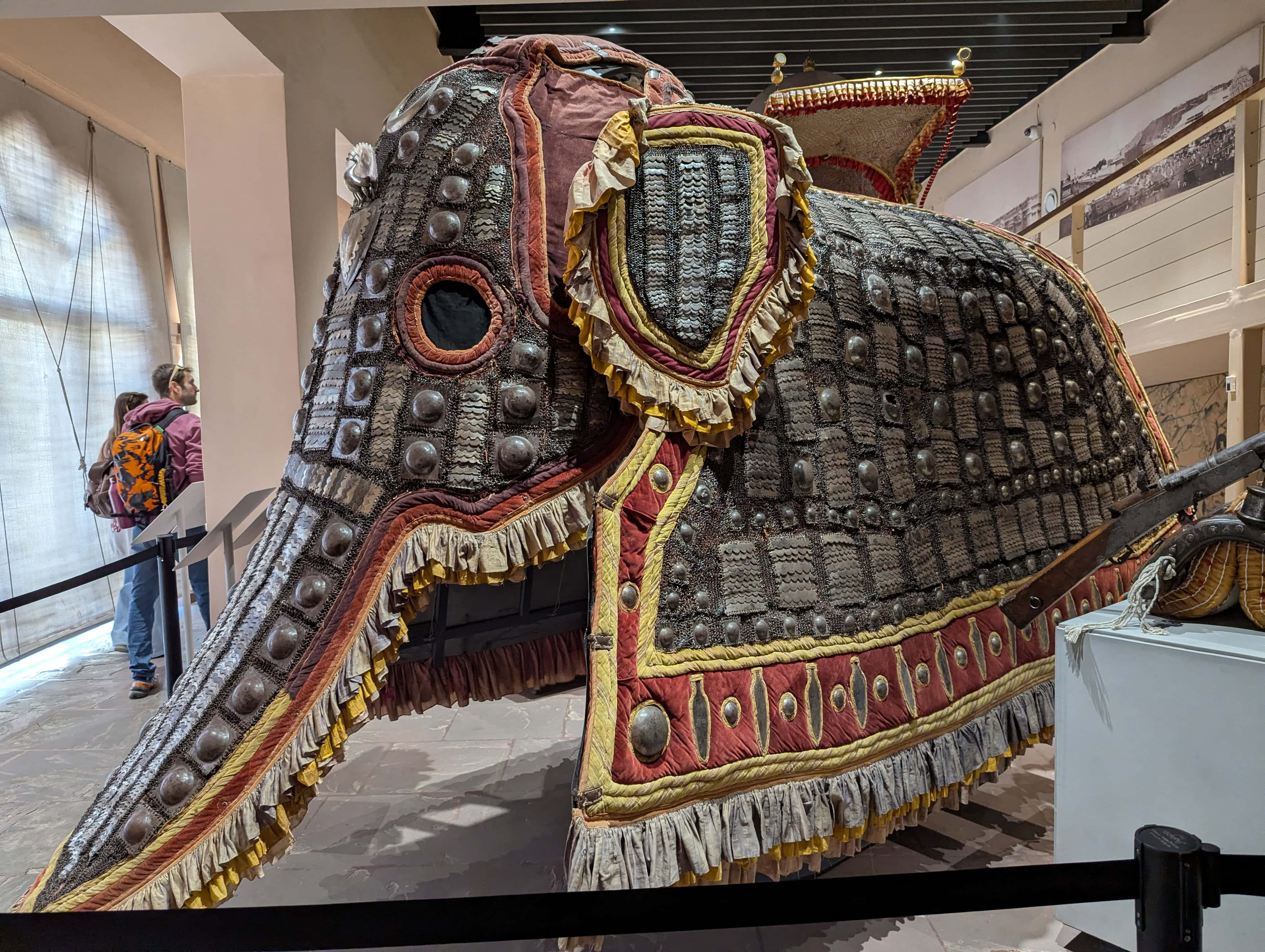
Indian elephant armor that was used to protect war elephants in battle, Jaipur, 17th century

In 1526, Babur, a descendant of Timur, invaded India and established the Mughal Empire. Babur introduced firearms and artillery into Indian warfare. He destroyed the army of Ibrahim Lodi at the First Battle of Panipat and the army of Rana Sanga in 1527 at the Battle of Khanua. The great Moghul Emperor Akbar (r. 1556–1605 AD) had 32,000 elephants in his stables. Jahangir, (reigned 1605–1627 A.D.) was a great connoisseur of elephants. He increased the number of elephants in service. Jahangir was stated to have 113,000 elephants in captivity: 12,000 in active army service, 1,000 to supply fodder to these animals, and another 100,000 elephants to carry courtiers, officials, attendants and baggage.

King Rajasinghe I laid siege to the Portuguese fort at Colombo, Sri Lanka, in 1558 with an army containing 2,200 elephants, used for logistics and siege work. The Sri Lankans had continued their proud traditions in capturing and training elephants from ancient times. The officer in charge of the royal stables, including the capture of elephants, was called the Gajanayake Nilame, while the post of Kuruve Lekham controlled the Kuruwe or elephant men. The training of war elephants was the duty of the Kuruwe clan who came under their own Muhandiram, a Sri Lankan administrative post.

=== South East Asia ===
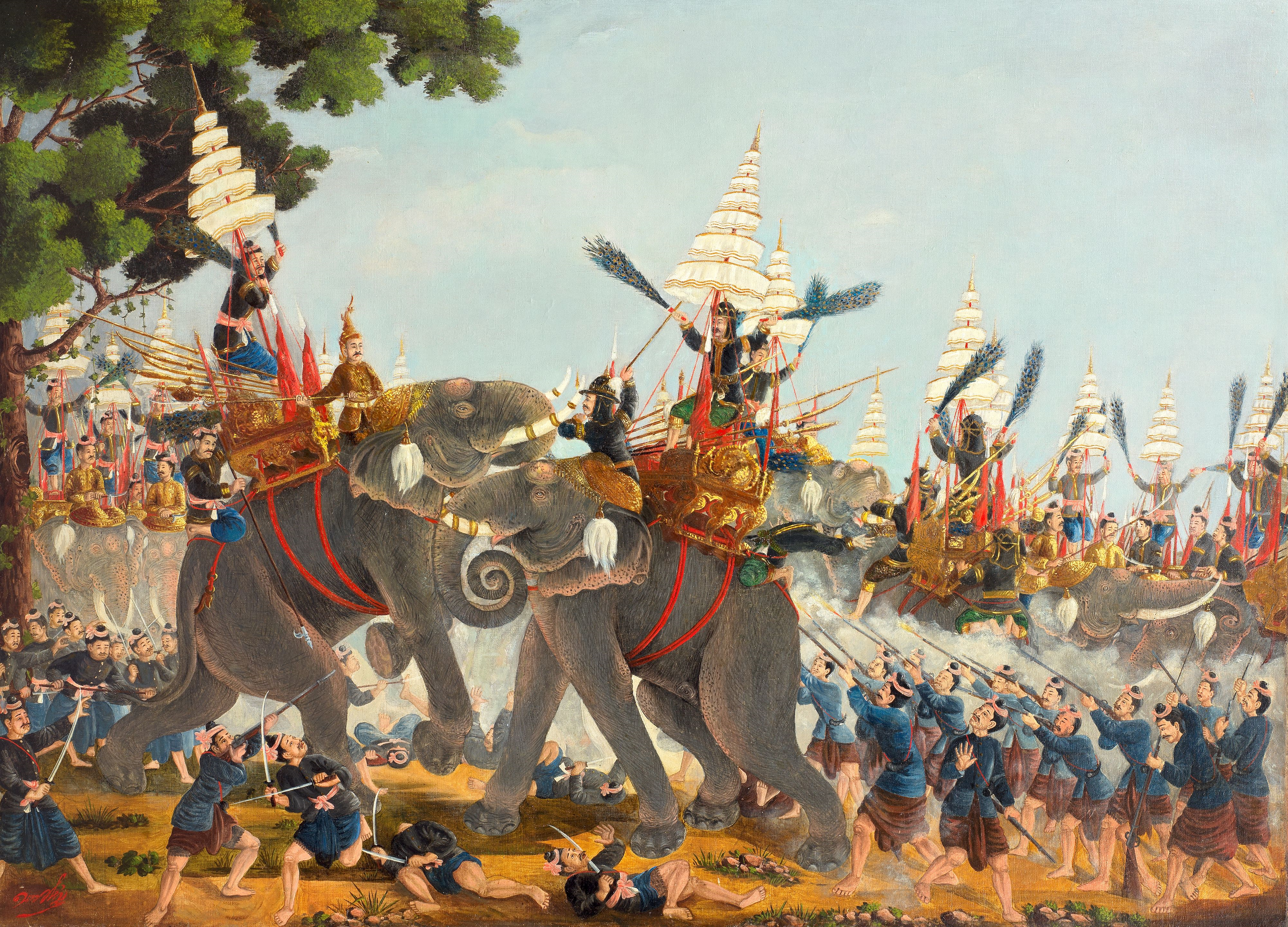
"The Great Battle of Yuthahatthi" – Siamese King Naresuan fights the Burmese crown prince near Suphanburi in January 1593.

In Southeast Asia, the powerful Khmer Empire had come to regional dominance by the 9th century AD, drawing heavily on the use of war elephants. Uniquely, the Khmer military deployed double cross-bows on the top of their elephants. With the collapse of Khmer power in the 15th century, the successor regional powers of Burma (now Myanmar) and Siam (now Thailand) also adopted the widespread use of war elephants. In many battles of the period it was the practice for leaders to fight each other personally in elephant duels. One famous battle occurred when the Burmese army attacked Siam's Kingdom of Ayutthaya. The war may have been concluded when the Burmese crown prince Mingyi Swa was killed by Siamese King Naresuan in personal combat on elephant in 1593. However, this duel may be apocryphal.

In Thailand, the king or general rode on the elephant's neck and carried ngaw, a long pole with a sabre at the end, plus a metal hook for controlling the elephant. Sitting behind him on a howdah, was a signaller, who signalled by waving of a pair of peacock feathers. Above the signaller was the chatras, consisting of progressively stacked circular canopies, the number signifying the rank of the rider. Finally, behind the signaller on the elephant's back, was the steerer, who steered via a long pole. The steerer may have also carried a short musket and a sword.

In Malaysia, 20 elephants battled the Portuguese during the Capture of Malacca (1511).

=== China ===
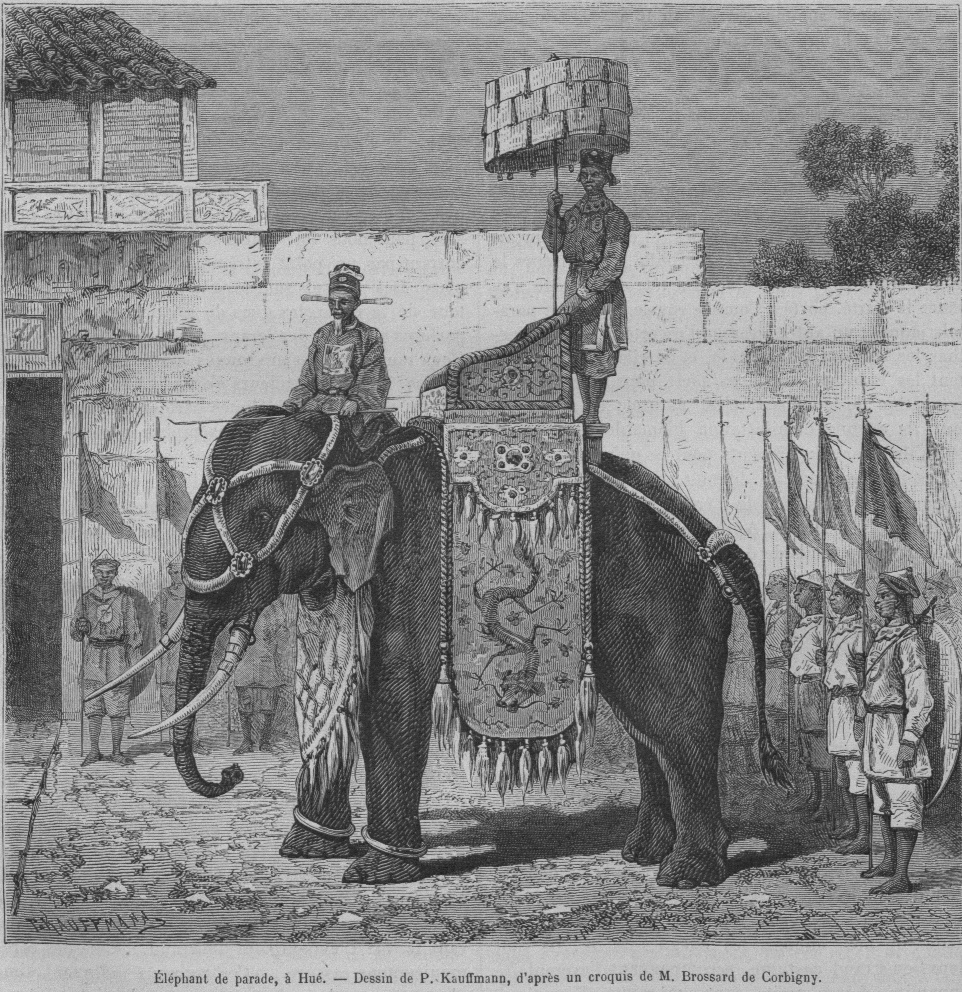
Elephant troops ("tượng binh") were an important part of the Vietnamese Nguyen dynasty army.

The Chinese continued to reject the use of war elephants throughout the period, with the notable exception of the Southern Han during the 10th century AD – the "only nation on Chinese soil ever to maintain a line of elephants as a regular part of its army". This anomaly in Chinese warfare is explained by the geographical proximity and close cultural links of the southern Han to Southeast Asia. The military officer who commanded these elephants was given the title "Legate Digitant and Agitant of the Gigantic Elephants". Each elephant supported a wooden tower that could allegedly hold ten or more men. For a brief time, war elephants played a vital role in Southern Han victories such as the invasion of Chu in 948 AD, but the Southern Han elephant corps were ultimately soundly defeated at Shao in 971 AD, being unable to withstand crossbow fire of the Song dynasty troops. As one academic has put it, "thereafter this exotic introduction into Chinese culture passed out of history, and the tactical habits of the North prevailed". However, as late as the Ming dynasty in as far north as Beijing, there were still records of elephants being used in Chinese warfare, namely in 1449 where a Vietnamese contingent of war elephants helped the Ming dynasty defend the city from the Mongols.

== Modern era ==
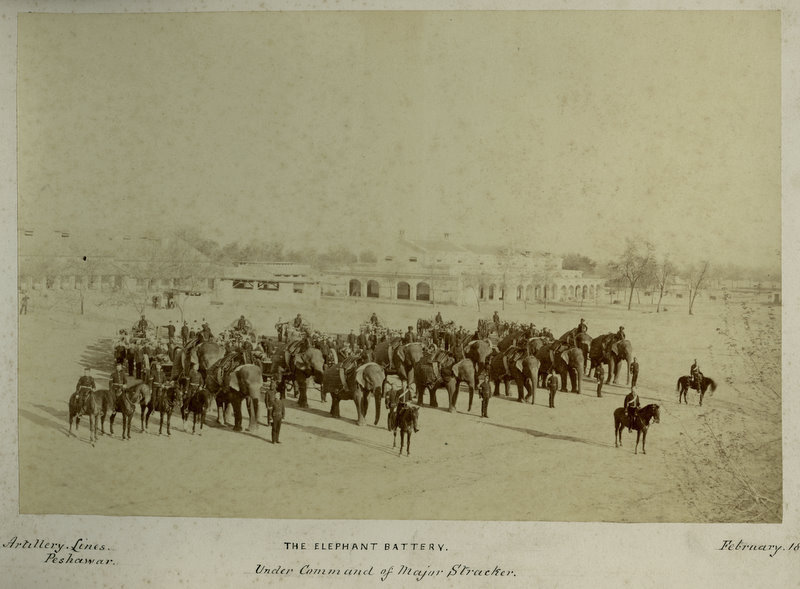
An elephant artillery battery in Peshawar

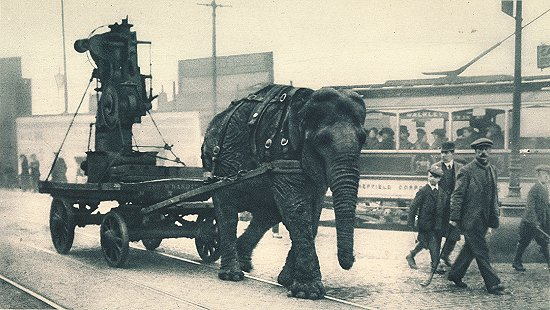
During World War I, elephants pulled heavy equipment. Lizzie (pictured) worked in a munitions yard in Sheffield.

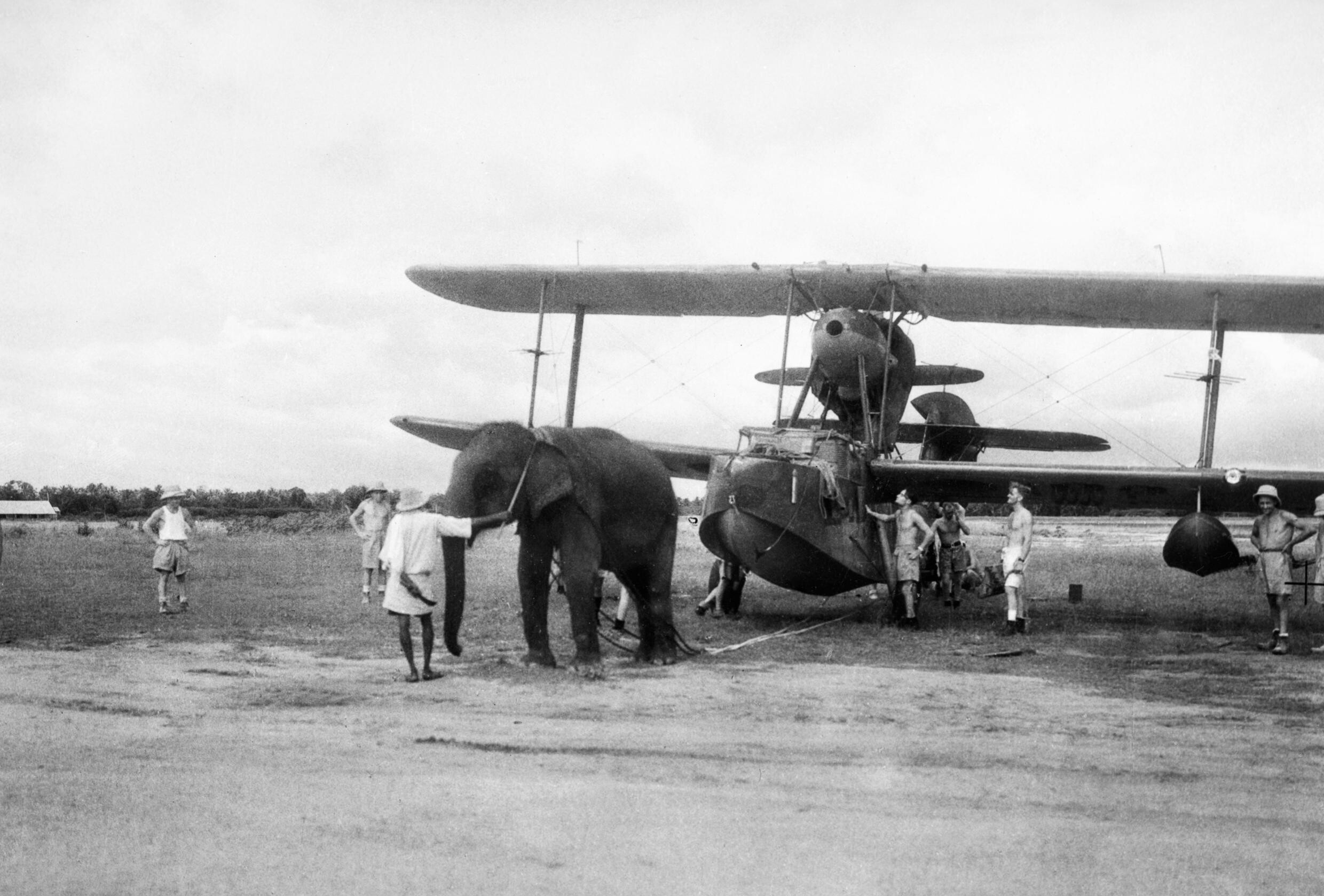
An elephant pulling a Supermarine Walrus aircraft, India, June 1944

With the advent of gunpowder warfare in the late 15th century, the balance of advantage for war elephants on the battlefield began to change. While muskets had limited impact on elephants, which could withstand numerous volleys, cannon fire was a different matter entirely – an animal could easily be knocked down by a single shot. With elephants still being used to carry commanders on the battlefield, they became even more tempting targets for enemy artillery.

Nonetheless, in southeast Asia the use of elephants on the battlefield continued up until the end of the 19th century. One of the major difficulties in the region was terrain, and elephants could cross difficult terrain in many cases more easily than cavalry. Burmese forces used war elephants against the Chinese in the Sino-Burmese War where they routed the Chinese cavalry. The Burmese used them again during the Battle of Danubyu during the First Anglo-Burmese War, where the elephants were easily repulsed by Congreve rockets deployed by British forces. The Siamese Army continued utilising war elephants armed with jingals up until the Franco-Siamese conflict of 1893, while the Vietnamese used them in battle as late as 1885, during the Sino-French War. During the mid to late 19th century, British forces in India possessed specialised elephant batteries to haul large siege artillery pieces over ground unsuitable for oxen.

Into the 20th century, military elephants were used for non-combat purposes in the Second World War, particularly because the animals could perform tasks in regions that were problematic for motor vehicles. Sir William Slim, commander of the XIVth Army wrote about elephants in his introduction to Elephant Bill: "They built hundreds of bridges for us, they helped to build and launch more ships for us than Helen ever did for Greece. Without them our retreat from Burma would have been even more arduous and our advance to its liberation slower and more difficult." Military elephants were used as late as the Vietnam War.

Elephants were as of 2017 being used by the Kachin Independence Army for an auxiliary role. Elephants are now more valuable to many armies in failing states for their ivory than as transport, and many thousands of elephants have died during civil conflicts due to poaching. They are classed as a pack animal in United States Army Field Manuals issued as recently as 2004, but their use by U.S. personnel is discouraged because elephants are endangered.

== Taming ==
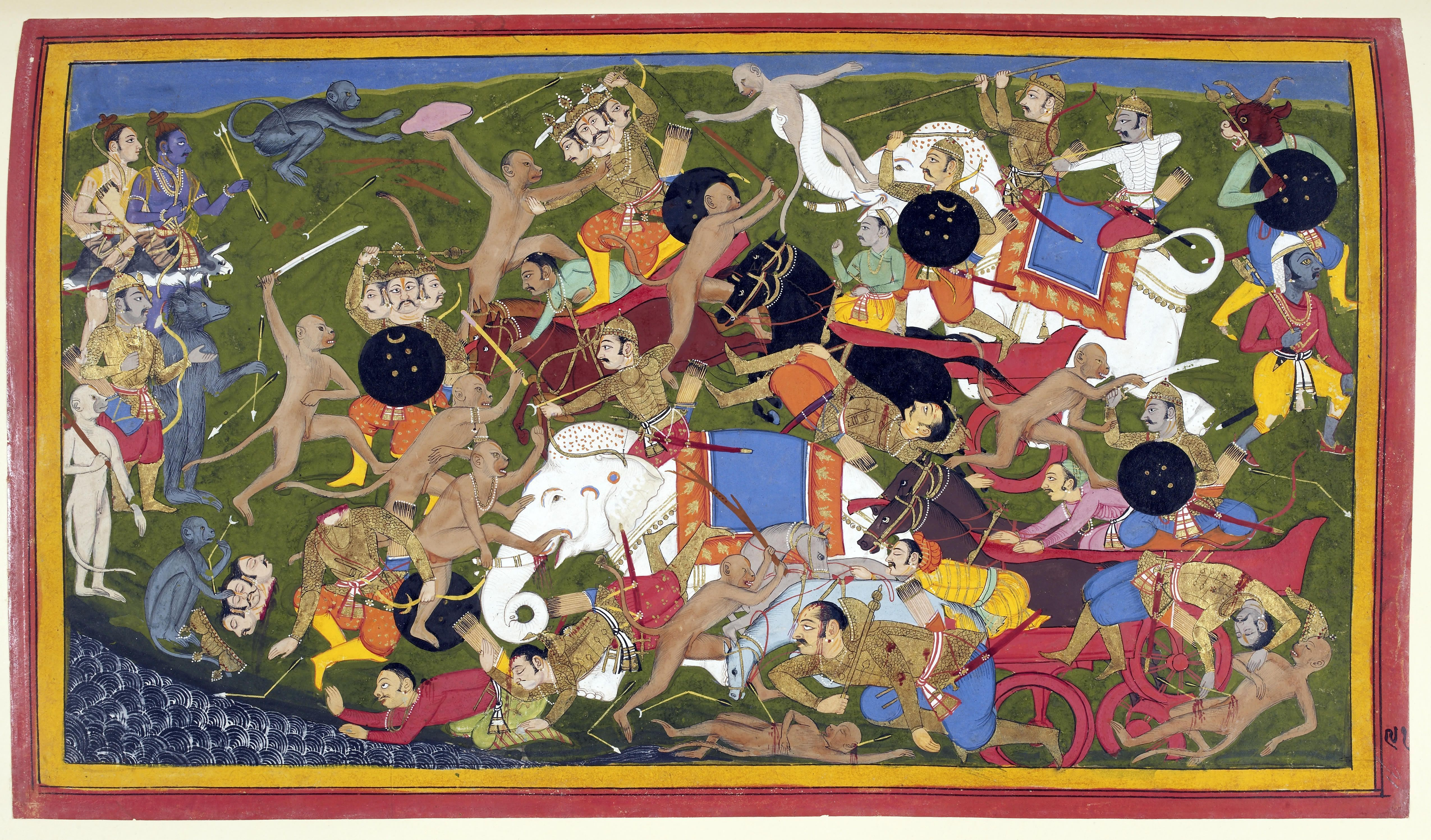
A 17th-century depiction of the war of Lanka in the ancient Indian epic Ramayana, showing war elephants

An elephant trainer, rider, or keeper is called a mahout. Mahouts were responsible for capturing and handling elephants. To accomplish this, they utilize metal chains and a specialized hook called an ankus, or 'elephant goad'. According to Chanakya as recorded in the Arthashastra, first the mahout would have to get the elephant used to being led. The elephant would have learned how to raise its legs to help a rider climb on. Then the elephants were taught to run and maneuver around obstacles, and move in formation. These elephants would be fit to learn how to systematically trample and charge enemies.

Capturing elephants from the wild remained a difficult, but necessary task given the difficulties of breeding in captivity and the long time required for an elephant to reach sufficient maturity to engage in battle. Sixty-year-old war elephants were prized as being at the most suitable age for battle service. Today an elephant is considered in its prime and at the height of its power between the ages of 25 and 40, yet elephants as old as 80 are used in tiger hunts because they are more disciplined and experienced.

It is commonly thought that the reason all war elephants were male was because of males' greater aggression, but it was instead because a female elephant in battle will run from a male; therefore only males could be used in war, whereas female elephants were more commonly used for logistics.

== Tactical use ==
A scene from the 1857 Indian Rebellion (note the sharpshooter on the elephant)

There were many military purposes for which elephants could be used. In battle, war elephants were usually deployed in the centre of the line, where they could be useful to prevent a charge or to conduct one of their own. Their sheer size and their terrifying appearance made them valued heavy cavalry. Off the battlefield they could carry heavy materiel, and with a top speed of approximately 30 kilometres per hour (19 mph) provided a useful means of transport, before mechanized vehicles rendered them mostly obsolete.

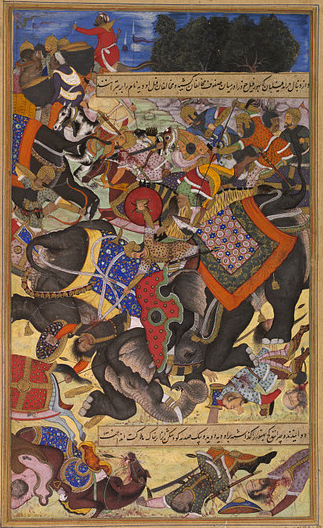
The elephant Citranand attacking another, called Udiya, during the Mughal campaign against the rebel forces of Khan Zaman and Bahadur Khan in 1567

In addition to charging, elephants could provide a safe and stable platform for archers to shoot arrows in the middle of the battlefield, from which more targets could be seen and engaged. The driver, called a mahout, was responsible for controlling the animal, who often also carried weapons himself, like a chisel-blade and a hammer (to kill his own mount in an emergency). Elephants were sometimes further enhanced with their own weaponry and armour as well. In India and Sri Lanka, heavy iron chains with steel balls at the end were tied to their trunks, which the animals were trained to swirl menacingly and with great skill. Numerous cultures designed specialized equipment for elephants, like tusk swords and a protective tower on their backs, called howdahs. The late sixteenth century saw the introduction of culverins, jingals and rockets against elephants, innovations that would ultimately drive these animals out of active service on the battlefield.

Besides the dawn of more efficient means of transportation and weaponry, war elephants also had clear tactical weaknesses that lead to their eventual retirement. After sustaining painful wounds, or when their driver was killed, elephants had the tendency to panic, often causing them to run amok indiscriminately, making casualties on either side. Experienced Roman infantrymen often tried to sever their trunks, causing instant distress, and possibly leading the elephant to flee back into its own lines. Fast skirmishers armed with javelins were also used by the Romans to drive them away, as well as flaming objects or a stout line of long spears, such as Triarii. Another method for disrupting elephant units in classical antiquity was the deployment of war pigs. Ancient writers believed that elephants could be "scared by the smallest squeal of a pig". Some warlords, however, interpreted this expression literally. At the siege of Megara during the Diadochi wars, for example, the Megarians reportedly poured oil on a herd of pigs, set them alight, and drove them towards the enemy's massed war elephants, which subsequently bolted in terror.

The value of war elephants in battle remains a contested issue. In the 19th century, it was fashionable to contrast the western, Roman focus on infantry and discipline with the eastern, exotic use of war elephants that relied merely on psychological tactics to defeat their enemy. One writer commented that war elephants "have been found to be skittish and easily alarmed by unfamiliar sounds and for this reason they were found prone to break ranks and flee". Nonetheless, the continued use of war elephants for several thousand years attests to their enduring value to the historical battlefield commander.

== Cultural legacy ==
Many traditional war games incorporate war elephants. The bishop in the game of chess is called an elephant in many languages, including Sanskrit, Malayalam, Russian, Bengali, Arabic, and Spanish. In Chinese chess the elephant serves as a defensive piece, moving two spaces diagonally on its own side. In Burmese Chess, the elephant moves one step diagonally or one step forward, representing the five limbs of the animal.

In the Japanese game shogi, there used to be a piece known as the "Drunken Elephant"; it was, however, dropped by order of the Emperor Go-Nara and no longer appears in the version played in today's Japan. However, the current piece known as the silver general moves just like the elephant in Burmese Chess.

Elephant armour, originally designed for use in war, is today usually only seen in museums. One particularly fine set of Indian elephant armour is preserved at the Leeds Royal Armouries Museum, while Indian museums across the sub-continent display other fine pieces. The architecture of India also shows the deep impact of elephant warfare over the years. War elephants adorn many military gateways, such as those at Lohagarh Fort for example, while some spiked, anti-elephant gates still remain, for example at Kumbhalgarh fort. Across India, older gateways are invariably much higher than their European equivalents, in order to allow elephants with howdahs to pass through underneath.

War elephants also remain a popular artistic trope, either in the Orientalist painting tradition of the 19th century, or in literature following Tolkien, who popularised a fantastic rendition of war elephants in the form of 'oliphaunts' or mûmakil.

The war elephant with a howdah or turret is a popular symbol known as the "elephant and castle".

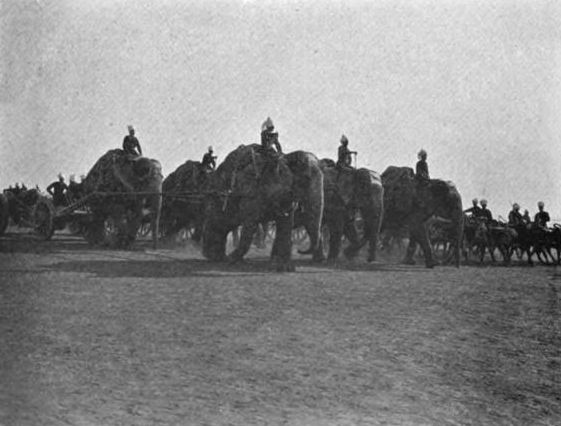
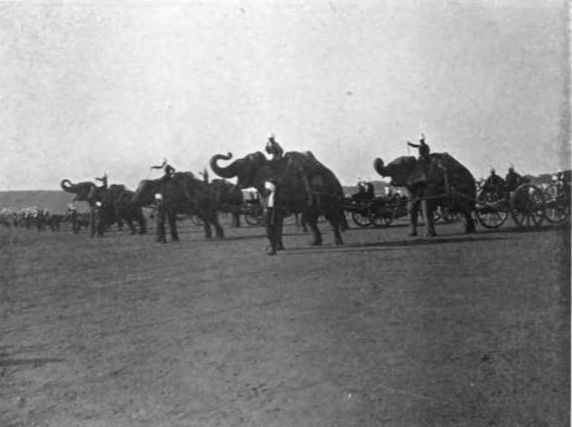
Elephants in use by Indian cavalry.

== In popular culture ==
Hathi from The Jungle Book by Rudyard Kipling is a former Indian war elephant who pulled heavy artillery for the British Indian Army. Kala-Nag from Toomai of the Elephants performed similar duties during the First Anglo-Afghan War.

Numerous strategy video games feature elephants as special units, usually available only to specific factions or requiring special resources. These include Age of Empires, Celtic Kings: The Punic Wars, the Civilization series, Fire Emblem: Fortune's Weave, the Total War series, Hearts of Iron IV, Europa Universalis IV, Imperator: Rome, Crusader Kings III and Old World.

In the 2004 film Alexander, the scene depicting the Battle of Hydaspes includes war elephants fighting against the Macedonian phalanx.

In the 2017 video game Assassin's Creed Origins, they are distributed around the map as boss fights.

In The Lord of the Rings: The Return of the King, Mûmakil (or Oliphaunts) are fictional giant elephant-like creatures used by Sauron and his Haradrim army in the Battle of the Pelennor Fields.

== See also ==
- Cavalry tactics
- Cultural depictions of elephants
- Execution by elephant
- History of elephants in Europe
- List of battles involving war elephants
- List of individual elephants
- Sassanid army
- Thai elephant
- Mahout
- Howdah

== General and cited references ==
- Andrade, Tonio (2016), The Gunpowder Age: China, Military Innovation, and the Rise of the West in World History, Princeton University Press, ISBN 978-0-691-13597-7.
- Andrade, Tonio (2019), "How Yongle learned to stop worrying and love the gun: Perspectives on Early Ming Military", in Ken, Swope (ed.), The Ming World, Taylor & Francis, pp. 71–87, ISBN 978-1-00-013466-7
- Chakravarti, P.C (2003). The Art of War in Ancient India.
- Charles, Michael B. (2007). "The Rise of the Sassanian Elephant Corps: Elephants and the Later Roman Empire". Iranica Antiqua. 42: 301–346. doi:10.2143/IA.42.0.2017880.
- Chinnock, E. J. The Anabasis of Alexander: The Battle of Gaugamela by Arrian. (trans).
- Davis, Paul K. (1999). 100 Decisive Battles from Ancient Times to the Present: The World's Major Battles and How They Shaped History.
- Di Cosmo, Nicola (2006), The Diary of Manchu Soldier in Seventeenth-Century China
- Ebrey, Patricia Buckley; Walthall, Anne; Palais, James (2006). East Asia: A Cultural, Social, and Political History. Boston: Houghton Mifflin Company. ISBN 0-618-13384-4.
- Fox, Robin L. (2004). Alexander the Great. Penguin. ISBN 0-14-102076-8.
- Goldsworthy, Adrian (2003). The Fall of Carthage: The Punic Wars 265–146 BC. Orion. ISBN 0-304-36642-0.
- Gowers, William (1947). "The African Elephant in Warfare". African Affairs. 46 (182). Oxford University Press: 42–49. doi:10.1093/oxfordjournals.afraf.a093538. JSTOR 718841.
- Irfan Habib; Vivekanand Jha (2004). Mauryan India. A People's History of India. Aligarh Historians Society / Tulika Books. ISBN 978-81-85229-92-8.
- Jayawardhene, Jayantha (1994). Elephant in Sri Lanka.
- Joregensen, Christer; Niderost, Eric; Rice, Rob S. (2008). Fighting Techniques of the Oriental World. Amber Books.
- Keegan, John (1993). A History of Warfare. Pimlico. ISBN 0-679-73082-6.
- Kiernan, Ben (2019). Việt Nam: a history from earliest time to the present. Oxford University Press. ISBN 978-0-19-005379-6.
- Kistler, John M. (2006). War Elephants. Westport, CT: Praeger.
- Lahiri Choudhury, D.K. (1988). "The Indian elephant in a changing world". In C.M. Borden (ed.). Conternporary Indian Tradition. Washington D.C. USA: Smithsonian Institution Press. pp. 303–321.
- Nossov, Konstantin (2008). War Elephants. Bloomsbury USA. ISBN 978-1-84603-268-4..
- Peers, C.J. (2006), Soldiers of the Dragon: Chinese Armies 1500 BC – AD 1840, Osprey Publishing Ltd
- Rance, Philip (2003). "Elephants in Warfare in Late Antiquity" (PDF). Acta Antiqua Academiae Scientiarum Hungaricae. 43 (3–4): 355–84. doi:10.1556/AAnt.43.2003.3-4.10.
- Rance, Philip (2009). "Hannibal, Elephants and Turrets in Suda Θ 438 [Polybius Fr. 162B] – An Unidentified Fragment of Diodorus". Classical Quarterly. 59 (1): 91–111. doi:10.1017/S000983880900007X. S2CID 170387260.
- Rawlinson, George (1885). The Seven Great Monarchies of the Ancient Eastern World: The Seventh Monarchy: History of the Sassanian or New Persian Empire (2007 reprint ed.). Kessinger. ISBN 978-1-4286-4792-3.
- H. C. Raychaudhuri (1988) [1967]. "India in the Age of the Nandas". In K. A. Nilakanta Sastri (ed.). Age of the Nandas and Mauryas (Second ed.). Delhi: Motilal Banarsidass. ISBN 978-81-208-0466-1.
- Said, Edward (1978). Orientalism. Knopf Doubleday Publishing. ISBN 0-394-74067-X..
- Sankalia, H.D. (1963). Ramayana: Myth or Reality. New Delhi: People's Publishing House. ISBN 9788170071006. OCLC 1170237.
- Schafer, Edward H. (1957). "War Elephants in Ancient and Medieval China". Oriens. 10 (2): 289–91. doi:10.2307/1579643. JSTOR 1579643.
- Scullard, H. (1948). "Hannibal's elephants". Numismatic Chronicle. Series 6. 8: 158–68.
- Scullard, H. H. (1974). The Elephant in the Greek and Roman World. London: Thames and Hudson. ISBN 0-500-40025-3.
- Singh, Upinder (2008). A History of Ancient and Early Medieval India: From the Stone Age to the 12th Century. Pearson Education India. ISBN 978-81-317-1677-9.
- Sun, Laichen (2003). "Chinese Military Technology and Dai Viet: c. 1390–1497". Asia Research Institute Working Paper Series No. 11. Singapore: Asia Research Institute.
- Sun, Laichen (2006). "Chinese Gunpowder Technology and Đại Việt, ca. 1390–1497". In Reid, Anthony; Tran, Nhung Tuyet (eds.). Viet Nam: Borderless Histories. Cambridge: Cambridge University Press. pp. 72–120. ISBN 978-1-316-44504-4.
- Terwiel, Barend Jan (2013). "What Happened at Nong Sarai? Comparing Indigenous and European Sources for Late 16th Century Siam". Journal of the Siam Society. 101.
- Wade, Geoff; Sun, Laichen (2010). Southeast Asia in the Fifteenth Century: The China Factor. Hong Kong University Press. ISBN 978-9971-69-448-7.
- White, Horace, ed. (1899). The Roman History of Appian of Alexandria. Vol. I. London; New York: George Bell and Sons. Vol. II (of 2).
- Ian Worthington (2014). By the Spear: Philip II, Alexander the Great, and the Rise and Fall of the Macedonian Empire. Oxford University Press. ISBN 978-0-19-992986-3.
