= Vahalkada =

Frontispiece of stupas in Sri Lanka

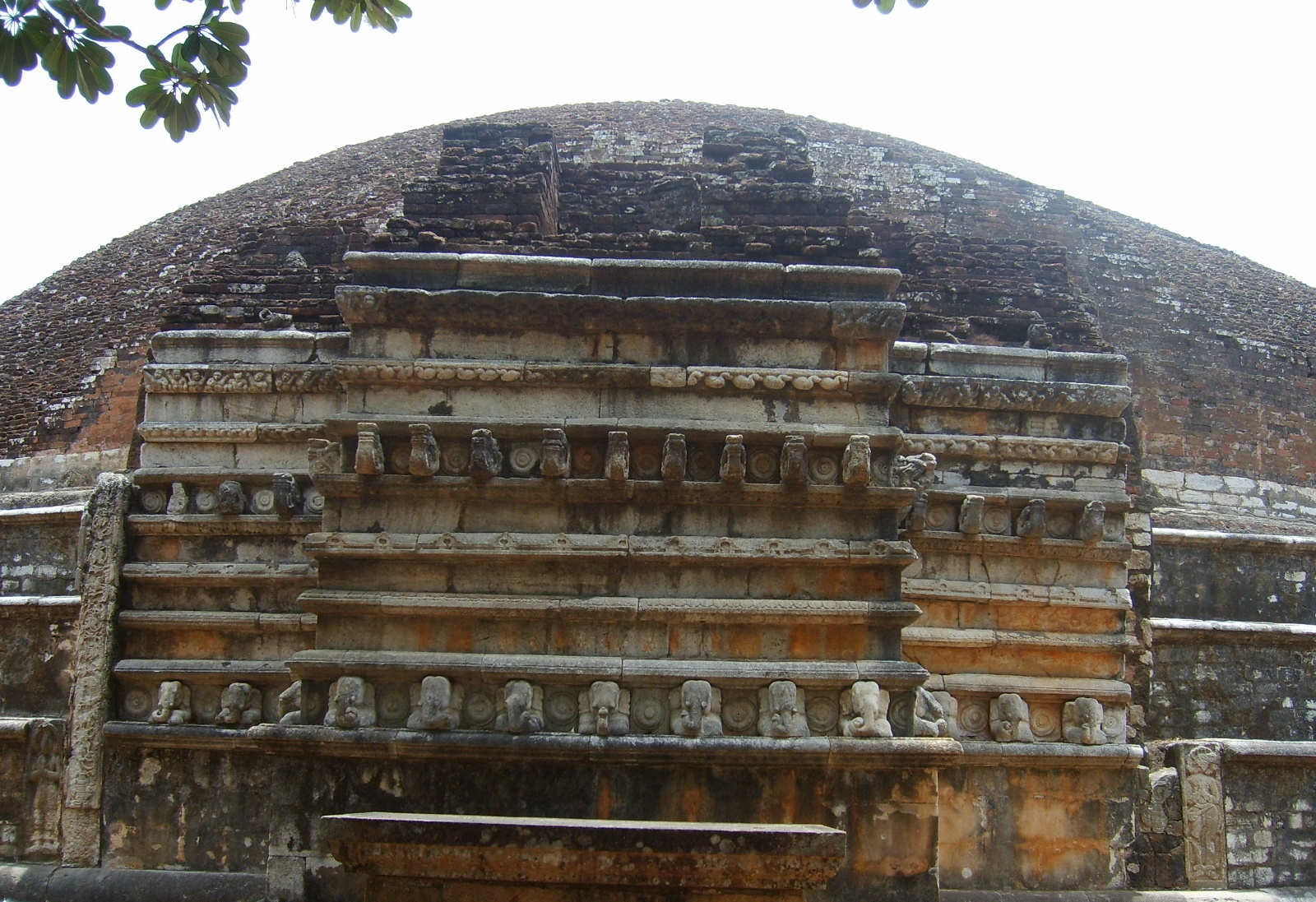
Kantaka Chaithya Vahalkada, Mihintale, Sri Lanka

A vahalkada (Sinhala: වාහල්කඩ), known as a frontispiece in English, is a structure constructed joining a stupa at its four cardinal directions as a decorative flourish. Later, these frontispieces came to be decorated or embellished with designs such as the creeper design. Stone slabs erected for the purpose of offering flower at the stupa too have been added to these frontispieces.

== See also ==
- Ancient stupas of Sri Lanka
- Architecture of ancient Sri Lanka
