= Seruwila Mangala Raja Maha Vihara =

Buddhist temple in Trincomalee, Sri Lanka

- සේරුවිල මංගල රජ මහා විහාරය; Seruwila Mangala Great Royal Temple
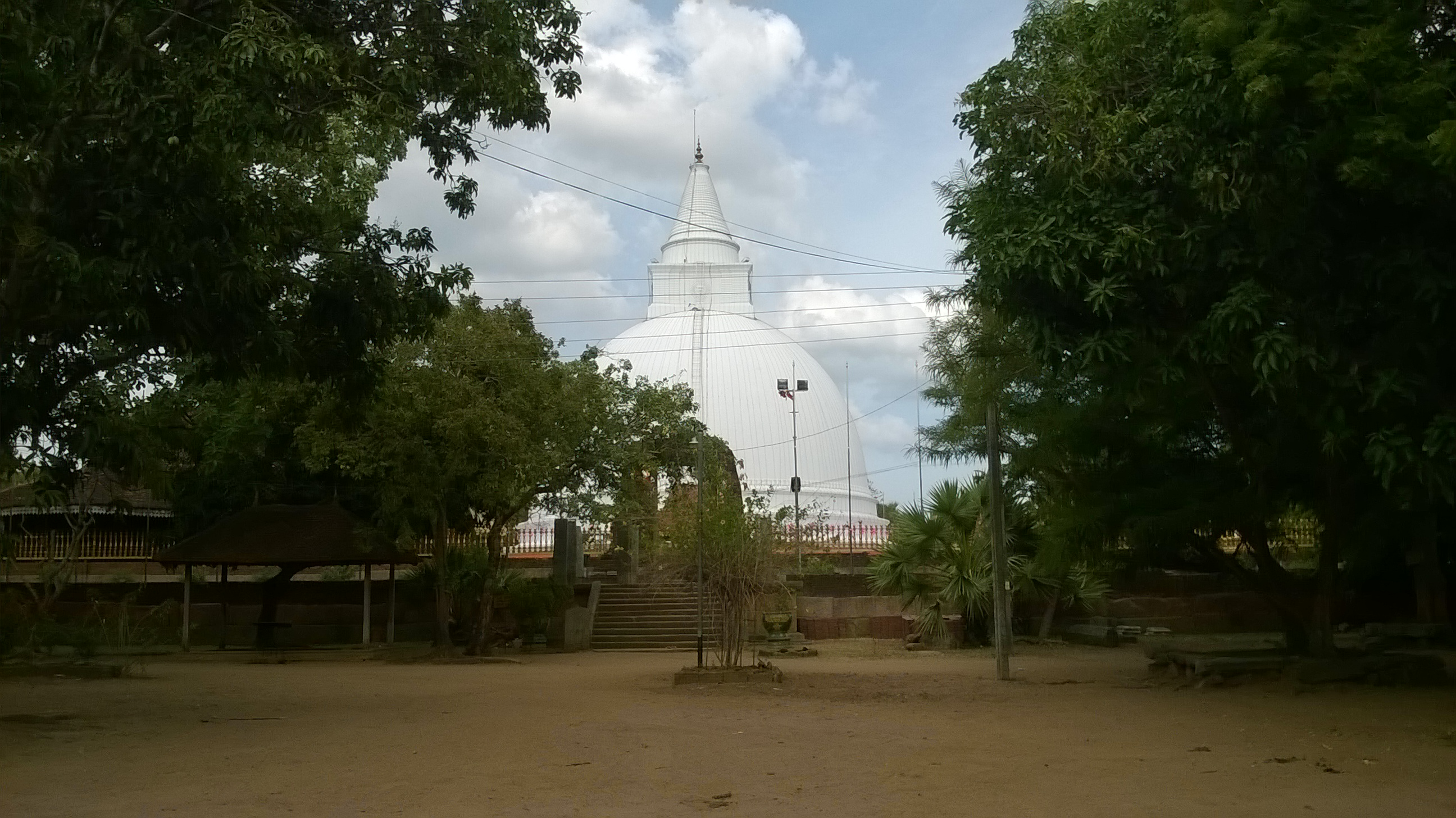
- Seruwila Mangala Maha Stupa

- Location within Sri Lanka

Religion
- Affiliation: Theravada Buddhism
- Sect: Administration: Amarapura Sri Kalaniwansha Chapter; Affiliated: Mahamevnawa Buddhist Monastery Network (Note: Seruwila Mangala Raja Maha Vihara is not a branch of the Mahamevnawa Buddhist Monastery Network, but only an affiliated temple. Its complete administration belongs to the Amarapura Sri Kalyaniwansa Chapter.)
- District: Trincomalee
- Province: Eastern Province
- Leadership: Ven. Aludeniye Subodhi Thero (Associated with Mahamevnawa Buddhist Monastery Network)

Location
- Location: Seruwawila, Sri Lanka
- State: Seruwawila
- Coordinates: 8°22′15″N 81°19′09.8″E

Architecture
- Type: Ancient Buddhist Temple- Early Anuradhapura Period
- Founder: King Kavantissa
- Completed: 2nd century BCE
- Archaeological Protected Monument of Sri Lanka

Seruwila Mangala Raja Maha Vihara (English: Seruwila Mangala Great Royal Temple) is an ancient Buddhist temple located in the Trincomalee District of the Eastern Province of Sri Lanka. It is recognised as the ninth of the Sixteen Sacred Solosmasthana, the holiest Buddhist pilgrimage sites in the country, and is identified with the historic Thissamaha Viharaya.

As part of the name of several temples, Raja Maha Vihara means in English: Great Royal Temple or Great Royal Monastery. It designates ancient Sri Lankan Buddhist temples that historically received royal patronage and donations from the king.

This sacred site was constructed by King Kavantissa in the 2nd century BCE, and it enshrines two revered relics of Gautama Buddha: the forehead relic/frontal bone relic (Lalata Dhatu) and the hair relics (Kesha Dhatu). This temple is currently a revered place of worship in Sri Lanka, affiliated with the Mahamevnawa Buddhist Monastery Network and operating under the Amarapura Sri Kalyaniwansa Chapter.

The temple can be accessed by both land and sea. The sea route begins with a boat journey from Trincomalee to Muttur, followed by an additional 16 kilometers through connecting roads. The land route leads through Kantale via the Allai road, covering approximately 45 kilometers through dense forest.

== History ==
According to Dhatuvamsa(Chronical of the Sacred Relics), after the Parinibbāna (death) of the Buddha, the sacred relics of the Blessed One were divided by the Brahmin named Dona among eight kings who came from different regions. Among them, one portion was received by the Malla Kings of Kusinara. It is said that within this portion, the sacred forehead relic (Lalāta Dhātu) was enshrined. The Third Great Disciple of the Buddha, the Maha Arahant Mahākassapa Thera, requested this sacred relic from the Malla Kings and received it. This was in accordance with a solemn prediction made by the Buddha regarding the forehead relic.

According to that prediction, it is stated in the sources that in the future, a king named Kavantissa would enshrine the sacred forehead relic on the southern bank of the great Mahāvāluka River in the island of Lanka, at the edge of a lake called Seru, near a rocky hill known as Varāhasoṇḍa.

Accordingly, the Maha Arahant Mahākassapa, after receiving the sacred forehead relic from the Mallas, foretold this prophecy and entrusted the relic to his disciple, the Venerable Nanda Thera. He enshrined the sacred relic in the Gandhakuti (fragrant chamber) where the Buddha had resided, inside the Kūṭāgāra Hall in the grand city of Viśālā, and continued to offer veneration there.

When time passed, and as Nanda Thera grew old and neared Parinibbāna after attaining Arahantship, he related the story to his disciple Chandragupta Thera and handed over the forehead relic to him. Chandragupta Thera too enshrined it in another Gandhakuti of the Buddha and continued the veneration. Later, through an unbroken lineage of disciples, the relic passed on to Bhaddasena, Jayasena, Saṅgharakkhita, Mahāsena, and Mahādeva Theras. They also enshrined and venerated the sacred forehead relic in various Gandhakutis in Jambudvīpa (India).

Eventually, the Arahant Mahādeva Thera, after the Buddha's Dispensation was established in Sri Lanka, during the reign of King Mahānāga of the Ruhuna region (contemporaneous with King Devānampiyatissa of Anuradhapura), journeyed with his disciples into the forested area of the Hattḥotta region of Ruhuna. It is said that during the four Uposatha (Poya) nights, white rays were seen shining from the sacred relic into the forest at night. A lay devotee named Mahākāla, having seen this, constructed a clear and beautiful relic chamber (Dhātugarbha) for it and later offered it to King Mahānāga, who ruled Ruhuna.

King Mahānāga then brought the sacred forehead relic to his palace and kept it under his guardianship. After him, the relic was inherited by King Yatālatissa and then by King Gotabhaya. From Gotabhaya, it passed on to King Kavantissa.

In accordance with the ancient prophecy, King Kavantissa, guided by the Arahant Cūllapiṇḍapātika Tissa Thera (brother of Queen Vihāramahādevī) and the Arahant Sāgala Thera of the Tissa Vihāra of Magama, constructed a stupa in the Seruvila region, near the rocky hill known as Varāhasoṇḍa.

It is also recorded that, for the construction of the stupa, much support was received from the Arahant Mahā Mahinda Thera and his group of fifty disciples from the nearby Somapura Somawathi Vihāra (present-day Seruvila Wilgamvehera Raja Maha Vihara), as well as from a regional ruler named Siva, who ruled over Serunuwara, King Giriyābhā of Somapura, and King Loṇa of Lona Nuwara.

After the construction of the beautiful Dhātugarbha (relic chamber) of the stupa, the sacred forehead relic was enshrined upon the forehead of a golden Buddha statue (said to be by the king's divine determination). Additionally, hair relics brought from Nāga world were placed atop the head of the statue by the arahants.

The completed Seruvila Lalāta Dhātu Stupa was then entrusted to the 500 Arhant Sangha community, led by Venerable Arhant Cūllapiṇḍapātika Tissa and Sāgala Theras. The king also donated lands stretching three yojanas (about 36 km (22 mi)) from the stupa to the monastery, as recorded in historical chronicles.

== Recent restoration ==
This sacred site fell into ruin around 1215 AD during the Kalinga Magha invasion. However, around 1921, the temple—then overgrown by jungle—was rediscovered by the Most Venerable Dambagasare Sri Sumedhankara Mahanayaka Thera, a Mahanayaka Thera of the Amarapura Sri Kalyaniwansha chapter.

At that time, although the site was popularly identified as a monastery in Southern Part of Sri Lanka.It is known as the "Tissamaharama",meanwhile Sumedhankara Thera, having read the Dhātuvamsa (Chronicle of the Relic), realised the correct location. Together with a group of devotees, he sailed from the Dodanduwa port near Galle to Trincomalee, and located the Seruvila temple deep within the dense forest. At the time of this discovery, he was a young monk.

About two years after rediscovering the stupa, he established the Chaitya Wardhana Samithiya organisation and began restoration work on the stupa, completing it within six years.

The stupa and its environs covering approximately 85 acres was declared as an Archaeological Reserve in 1962. After this the Department of Archaeology was carrying out conservation work by stages. In view of the importance of this sacred shrine and to attract more pilgrims to the area, the Department of Town and Country Planning drew up a plan for the development of a new town complete with pilgrim rests, market areas, etc. during the 1970s.

The Dambagasare Sumedhankara Thero died in 1984. After his death, during the height of the Northern and Eastern conflict involving the Liberation Tigers of Tamil Eelam, the monastery was protected and maintained by Venerable Seruvila Saranakitti Anunayaka Thera as the chief incumbent monk.

In June 2009, it was refurbished and ceremonially opened for the veneration of a large number of devotees at a cost of nearly Rs. 25 million by the National Physical Planning Department under the guidance of Urban Development and Sacred Area Development Minister Dinesh Gunawardane.

Later, due to structural issues such as cracks on the stupa platform, a final phase of restoration was carried out in 2012 under the guidance of Most Ven.Kiribathgoda Gnanananda Thera and the Mahamevnawa Monastic Order.

Following the demise of Venerable Saranakitti Anunayaka Thera in 2016, the chief incumbency was taken up by Ven. Munhene Meththārāma Nayaka Thera. After his death in 2021, the role was assumed by one of the disciples of both him and Most Ven.Kiribathgoda Gnanananda Thera — Ven. Aludeniyē Subodhi Thera.

Today, the Seruvila Mangala Raja Maha Viharaya operates under his leadership as one of the principal monasteries of the Mahamevnawa Meditation Monastery Network, and is also affiliated with the Amarapura Sri Kalyaniwansa Chapter.

== Seruvawila area ==
According to historical sources, the name Seruvawila is believed to have originated from the presence of a lake called Seruvila (currently known as the Allai Tank) in this area. A widely held belief is that the name was derived because large numbers of birds known as "seru" frequently visited the lake.

In addition, several large monasteries have been associated with the Seruvawila region (which is considered part of the Kottiyarama division — Kottiyarama being a term believed to refer to a place with hundreds of monasteries). Historical accounts suggest that a significant community of monks lived in this area in ancient times. Specifically, the Seruvila Mangala Raja Maha Viharaya (also known as the Tissamaha Vihara) and the ancient Somawathi Viharaya, currently identified as the Seruvila Wilgamvehera Raja Maha Viharaya, indicate the presence of a large monastic population.

There is also a belief that the lake was regularly visited by monks for their daily needs, and hence the name Seruvawila evolved from "Sivuru Aa Vila" (the lake that robes came to).

The Seruvila Wilgamvehera Raja Maha Viharaya is situated close to the lake.

According to Richard Leslie Brohier, Seruvila was once a vast floodplain or wetland area where waters from the Mahaweli River collected. During seasonal migrations, this wetland became a sanctuary for large flocks of teals (birds referred to as "seru"). He proposed, as a scholar, that this may have led to the area being named Seruvawila.

Furthermore, the Kiliveddi Sri Vardhana Bodhi Tree, which was once located in the Seruvila region and affiliated with the Seruvila Mangala Raja Maha Viharaya, is believed by scholars to have been a sacred Dethispalaraha Bodhi (a Bodhi tree with 32 saplings). However, it is no longer visible today. In the 1970s, it is believed that a group of Hindu devotees removed the Bodhi tree and constructed a kovil (Hindu temple) at the site.

== See also ==
- List of Archaeological Protected Monuments in Sri Lanka
- Ancient constructions of Sri Lanka
- Solosmasthana
- Dambagasare Sumedhankara Thero
