= 13th Television State Drama Festival =

Annual television awards in Sri Lanka

- Awarded for: Excellence in Television
- Date: 21 November 2018
- Venue: Nelum Pokuna Theater, Colombo
- Country: Sri Lanka
- First award: 2018

Highlights
- Most wins: Bedde Kulawamiya (11)
- Best picture: Bedde Kulawamiya

Television/radio coverage
- Network: Television in Sri Lanka

The 13th Television State Drama Festival (Sinhala: 13වැනි රූපවාහිනී කලා රාජ්‍ය සම්මාන උලෙළ), was held to honor the best films of 1996 Sinhala cinema on 21 November 2018, at the Nelum Pokuna Theater, Colombo, Sri Lanka. Minister of Regional Infrastructure Development S. B. Nawinne and Film Poetry and Veteran Film Director Sumitra Peries were the chief guests at the awards night. It was jointly organized by the State Television Arts Advisory Council, Arts Council of Sri Lanka, Department of Cultural Affairs, Ministry of Cultural Affairs and Regional Development.

The Nomination Certificate Award Ceremony of the 2018 Rupavahini Arts State Awards Ceremony was held at the Bandaranaike International Memorial Conference Hall on 7 November 2018. For the ceremony, around 600 different types of programs were directed and several tribunals worked. About 30 programs, children's dramas and tele films were also monitored.

== Awards ==
=== Program awards ===
- Best Supplementary Tape – World Water Day: Sharon Prageeth (Sirasa TV)
- Best Advertising, Promotional Advertising – Polythene pollution: Chamara Wijesinghe (National Television)
- Best Animation – Aeth Perehera: Dinesh Nayanajith Chandrasena (TV One)
- Best Children's Program – Sindu Panthiya: Imali Ariyawansa (Siyatha TV)
- Best Cultural Audio Visual Program – Sameepa Rupaya Saha Dura Rupaya Athara Pathi: Manjula Athugala (ITN)
- Best Audio Combination – Derana Dream Star Season 7: Bandara Dissanayake (TV Derana)
- Best Visual Combination – Sirasa Junior Super Star: Shehan Ranawickrama (Sirasa TV)
- Best Dubbing program – Adhiraja Dharmasoka: Ranjivani Beddevithana (TV Derana)
- Best Magazine Program – Sukkanama: Tharangi Athuraliya (National Television)
- Best music program – Ma Nowana Mama: Chinthaka Gamlath (TV Derana)
- Best background design – Thambapanni: Nishantha Aluthgamgoda (National Television)
- Best lighting – Thambapanni: Nandasena Rajapaksa (National Television)
- Best multi-camera production – Sirasa Pentathlon: Pulidu Missaka Edirisinghe (Sirasa TV)

=== Teledrama awards ===
- Best Single-episode teledrama – Shodhaka: Lasitha Kariyawasam (Shraddha TV)
- Best Sound Design – See Raja: Mithun Karunatilake and Himal Dharmaratne (Swarnavahini)
- Best Teledrama Theme Song Lyricist – See Raja: Jackson Anthony (Swarnavahini)
- Best Teledrama Theme Song Music Director – See Raja: Samantha Perera (Swarnavahini)
- Best Teledrama Singer – See Raja: Samantha Perera, Yasharu Pankaja Perera, Nirupadi Thishakkaya Perera
- Best Teledrama Music Director – Bedde Kulawamiya: Gayan Ganakadara (Swarnavahini)
- Best Editor – Bedde Kulawamiya: Jagath Weeratunga (Swarnavahini)
- Best Cameraman – Bedde Kulawamiya: Thisara Thulwan (Swarnavahini)
- Best Feature Composition – See Raja: Harsha Manjula (Swarnavahini)
- Best Art Direction – See Raja: Dhammika Hewaduwatta (Swarnavahini)
- Best Teledrama Screenplay – Bedde Kulawamiya: Aruna Premaratne (Swarnavahini)
- Best Supporting Actress Role – Bedde Kulawamiya: Chandani Seneviratne for the role 'Kumari Menike' (Swarnavahini)
- Best Supporting Actor Role – Bedde Kulawamiya: Ananda Kumara Unnehe for the role 'Jinapala' (Swarnavahini)
- Best Actress – Bedde Kulawamiya: Nadee Kammellaweera for the role 'Chanchala' (Swarnavahini)
- Best Actor – Bedde Kulawamiya: Mahendra Perera for the role 'Edwin' (Swarnavahini)
- Best Teledrama Director – Bedde Kulawamiya: Ananda Abeynayake (Swarnavahini)
- Best Teledrama – Bedde Kulawamiya: Fahim Maujud (Swarnavahini)

=== Lifetime Achievement Award ===
- Thusitha Munindradasa, Veteran Camera Director

=== Special Jury Awards ===
- Jackson Anthony – direction of See Raja (Swarnavahini)
- Bimsara Premaratne – role of 'Rangana' in Bedde Kulawamiya (Swarnavahini)
- Samadhi Laksiri – role in Diyamankada (ITN)
- Kelum Gamlath – role in Sonduru Dadayakkaraya (ITN)

=== Merit awards ===
- Best Tele Movie – Umathu Horawa: Diluka Prasad Gunathilake (TV Derana)
- Best Documentary Play – Suranganavi: Dr. Kapila Krishantha Sooriyarachchi (TV Derana)
