= Sri Angulimala Maha Stupa, Sri Lanka =

Sri Angulimala Maha Stupa
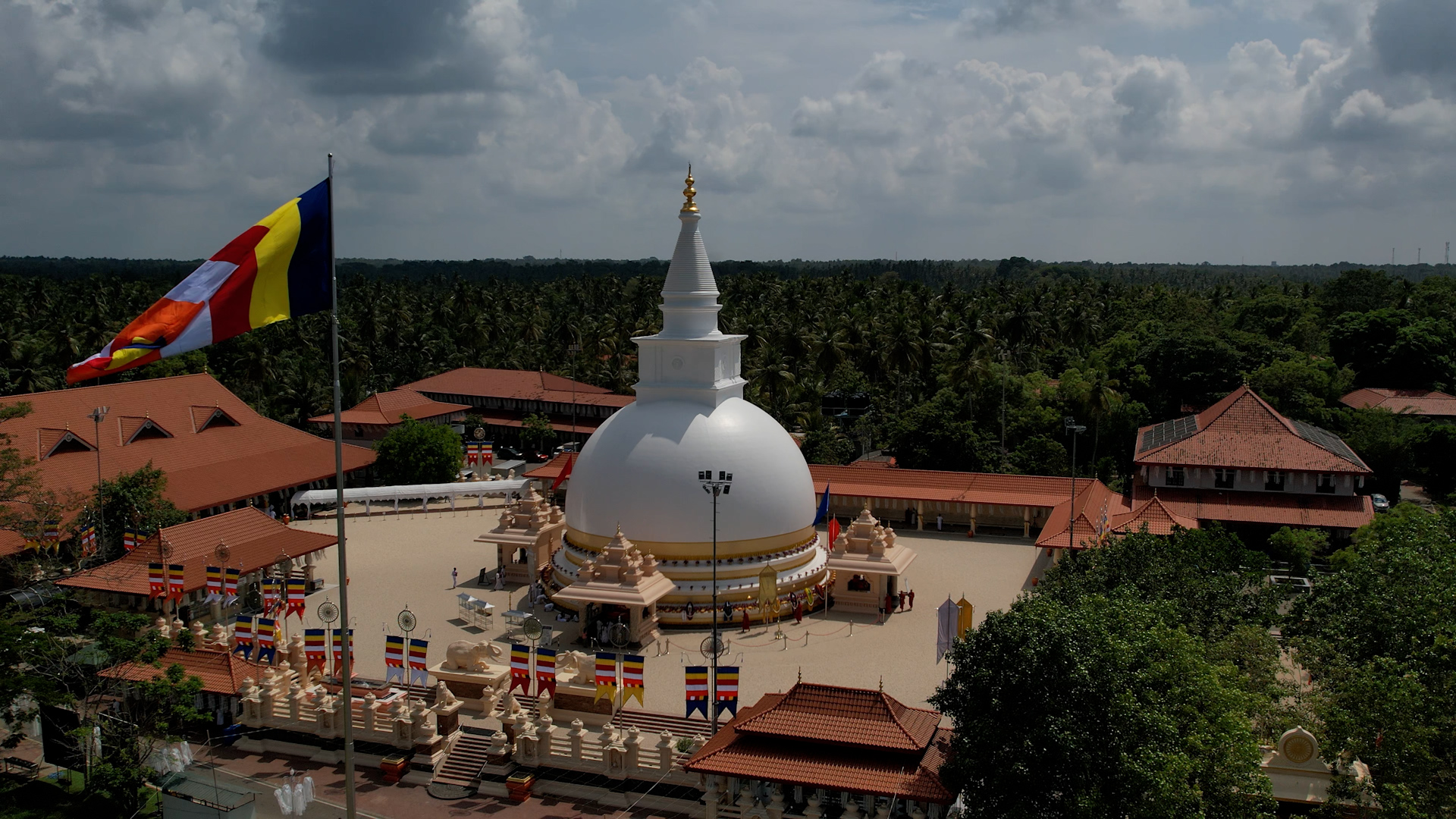
- Sri Angulimala Maha Stupa

- Location in Sri Lanka

Religion
- Affiliation: Theravada

Location
- Location: Mahamevnawa Buddhist Monastery Branch, Bowatta,Sri Lanka
- Country: Sri Lanka
- Interactive map of Sri Angulimala Maha Stupa
- Coordinates: 7°35′36.9″N 79°58′03.5″E

Architecture
- Founder: Most Venarable Kiribathgoda Gnanananda Thero
- Completed: 2020
- Height (max): 34 m (112 ft)

Sri Angulimala Maha Stupa (Sri Angulimala Maha Seya) is a Relic Stupa which houses eight relics of Lord Buddha and 1,000 relics of Angulimala Maharath Thera located in Chilaw, Bowatta area. Accordingly, Sri Angulimala Maha Stupa is the stupa with the largest number of relics of Angulimala Maharath Thera in the whole world. The Mahamevnava Buddhist Monastery Network has the custody of Sri Angulimala Maha Stupa.

== Construction of Sri Angulimala Maha Stupa ==
First of all, on 18 March 2019, the relics of Angulimala Maharahat Thera were brought and the Mahamevnawa Buddhist Monastery Branch, Bowatta where the stupa is being built was placed in a beautiful pavilion in the Buddhist Monastery and a Buddha Wandanawa, an Arahath pilgrimage Wandanawa was performed. The preparation of the Stupa site started on 29 March 2019. On 18 April 2019, the first construction brick was laid for the stupa. The deposition of the relics of Lord Buddha in the square chamber of Sri Angulimala Stupa took place on 7 May 2020, that is Vesak Full moon Poya Day. On the 16th of the same Vesak, the sacred pinnacle took place. The deposition of the relics of Angulimala Maharahath Thera took place on 4 July 2020, that is, on the night of Esala Full Moon Poya Day, with the participation of more than 700 of Buddhist Monks who had gathered at Mahamevnawa Buddhist Monastery. The Sri Angulimala Maha Seya Vihara, complete with all traditional monastic components including the Dharmashala (preaching hall), Sevanamandapa (rest pavilion), Hevisi Mandapa (drumming hall), Dana Shala (alms hall), Bodhi Mandapa (sacred Bodhi tree shrine), and Sanghawasa (monastic residence), was ceremonially offered to the Gautama Supreme Buddha's Dispensation on the Vesak Full Moon Poya Day, 12 May 2025, which corresponds to the 12th of Vesak month in the Buddhist Year 2569.

== Speciality of Sri Angulimala Stupa ==
Sri Angulimala Maha Stupa shining in the middle of the beautiful paddy with a height of approximately 37 m (120 ft) is a great stupa housing eight relics of Lord Buddha and 1,000 relics of Angulimala Maharahath Thera. Sri Angulimala Maha Stupa has the largest number of relics of Angulimala Maharahath Thera.

== Chant Veneration Text of Sri Angulimala Maha Stupa ==
=== Chant of Veneration Text in Pali ===
Sirīmatō lōkanāthassa-Dhātujjalita muddhanī
Jinaputtaṁgulimālassa-Dhātugabbhē patiṭṭhitaṁ
Taṁ tējamānaṁ daddallamānaṁ- Vandāmahaṁ aṁgulimāla thūpaṁ

=== English Meaning of Pali Text ===
The relics of Lord Buddha are kept in the square chamber of the Stupa.-The relics of Angulimala Maharhath Thera are kept in the central relic chamber of the Stupa.
The virtues of Lord Buddha and the virtues of the Arhath Sangha spread throughout the world.-This makes the Great Stupa of Angulimala shine.
Sadhu ! Sadhu !! I worship that stupa

=== Chant of Veneration Text in Sinhala ===
සිරිමත් ලෝ නා මුනි රජිඳුන්නේ- ධාතූන් සෑ මුදුනෙහි වැඩ ඉන්නේ
උතුම් අඟුල්මල් මහ තෙරිඳුන්නේ-ධාතූන් සෑ ගැබ මැද වැඩ ඉන්නේ
බුදුගුණ මූණි ගුණ තෙද පැතිරෙන්නේ-අංගුලිමාල මහ සෑ බබළන්නේ
සාදු සාදු මහ සෑය වඳින්නේ
