= Mahamevnawa =

Mahamevnawa may refer to:

- Mahamevnāwa Park in Anuradhapura
- Mahamevnawa Buddhist Monastery, Sri Lanka
