= Dambagasare Sumedhankara Thera =

Dambagasare Sri Sumedhankara Thera was a Buddhist monk from Sri Lanka who re-discovered the Seruvila Mangala Raja Maha Viharaya in 1922.

In early 1922 young Sumedankara Thera set sail from Dodanduwa,Galle, Southern Province and arrived at Muttur, Trincomalee by a maha-oruwa (local coaster). He had to walk the 14 miles to Seruvila and trekked four miles of thick jungle before arriving at a place strewn with ruins. He soon undertook the task of restoration with the patronage of a few Southern Sinhala Buddhist traders in Trincomalee, Mudliyar D. D. Weerasinghe and the Archeological Department. In 1931, the stupa was opened to the public veneration.

The temple is among the sixteen holiest Buddhist shrines Solosmasthana in Sri Lanka and thought to contain relics of four Buddhas: Kakusandha, Koṇāgamana, Kassapa and Gautama. It is also believed to be the seventeenth place where the Buddha visited during his visits to the country and the only place where the Buddha offered flowers.

He is the teacher of Kiribathgoda Gnanananda Thera, the founder and chief advisor of Mahamevnawa Maha Sangha Sabha, Mahamevnawa Buddhist Monasteries and Shraddha Media Network.
