= Shraddha TV =

Sri Lankan Buddhist TV channel

- Country: Sri Lanka
- Broadcast area: Sri Lanka
- Headquarters: Kaduwela, Western Province

Programming
- Languages: Sinhala, Tamil, English
- Picture format: HDTV 1080

Ownership
- Owner: Mahamevnawa Buddhist Monastery Network
- Sister channels: Lakviru Radio & Kids TV

History
- Launched: 29 September 2012

Links
- Webcast: https://www.youtube.com/@ShraddhaTVLive/streams
- Website: www.shraddha.lk

Availability

Terrestrial
- UHF (Colombo, Gongala, Gammaduwa): 55
- TV Lanka Digital TV: Channel 10
- Dialog TV: Channel 27
- Freesat: Channel 22
- Peo TV: Channel 99

Shraddha TV is a non-profit Buddhist television channel based in Sri Lanka. The channel is known for airing religious spiritual content with a primary focus on Buddhism and the teaching of Buddha. Most of the programming is shot at the Mahamevnawa Buddhist monastery in Kaduwela.

Shraddha TV was officially launched on 29 September 2012 on the cable television service, PEO TV. It was subsequently included on the home satellite television service, Dialog TV and Freesat . The founder of television channel is Kiribathgoda Gnanananda Thero, who is also the founder of Mahamevnawa Buddhist Monastery. The chairperson of Shraddha TV is Sudath Annasiwaththa.

The channel is owned by the Mahamevnawa Buddhist Monastery and is broadcast from Kaduwela, a suburb of Colombo. Shraddha stands for devotion. It uses content from real life and advertises itself as being suitable for people of all ages and religious persuasions. It broadcasts Dhamma Sermons, Dhamma Discussions, Meditation Guides, documentaries, and Charity Services 24 hours a day via Dialog TV Channel No 27, Freesat Channel No 22 and SLT Peo TV Channel No 99. Its main tagline is "The Noble friend of Television Media". Shraddha TV started terrestrial broadcasting for the Western province via UHF 55 on 2015-12-31.

The channel frequently discusses the "Fundamentals of Buddhist Teachings", such as the Four Noble Truths, Noble Eightfold Path, Pratītyasamutpāda, Skandha - Five Aggregates of Clinging, etc.

Vishama Bhaga (Sinhala: විෂම භාග) (English: The Other Half) is a 2019 Sri Lankan Sinhala drama film directed by Lalith Ratnayake and produced by Shraddha Film Productions. Also in 2020, Shraddha TV dubbed a Thai movie Love over 3D into a Sinhala version titled 'Biyakaruya Me Sasara'.

== Programmes ==
Programme Type	Current	Finished
Dhamma Sermons	Dam Siha Nada (Repeat)	Vishmitha Awabodhaya
Dhamma Sermons	Arunodaye Sadaham Sithuwilla	Vedana Samyukthaya
Dhamma Sermons	Sudam Arana	Piriniwuni E Rahath Muniwaru
Dhamma Sermons	Ayathanakusala	Kosala Samyuttaya
Dhamma Sermons	Swakkatha	Akalika Munidaham
Dhamma Sermons	Saddharma Warsha	Nikeles Theranivaru
Dhamma Sermons	Nuwana Wadena Bosath Katha	
Dhamma Sermons	Sampasadini	
Dhamma Sermons	Ogha Tharana	
Dhamma Sermons	Asirimath Damsaka	
Dhamma Sermons	Saddharma Yathra	
Dhamma Sermons	Sitha Niwana Bawana	
Dhamma Sermons	Sangeethi Sutta Warnanawa	
Dhamma Discussions	Yowun Daham Wadasatahana	Sudam Sabhava
Dhamma Discussions	Veemansa	
Dhamma Discussions	Damsabha Mandapaya	
Education	Pali Panthiya	
English Programmes	Path to happiness	
English Programmes	Wise Shall Realize	
English Programmes	Wisdom for the little hearts	
Pirith Chanting	Morning, Afternoon and Night Pirith Chanting Programs	

== See also ==
- Global Buddhist Network
- The Buddhist (TV channel)
- Lord Buddha TV
- Buddhist Publication Society & Pariyatti (bookstore)
- Buddhist Cultural Centre
- Access to Insight
