= Kiribathgoda Gnanananda Thera =

Sri Lankan monk (born 1961)

Most Venerable Kiribathgoda Gnanananda Thera
- අතිපූජ්‍ය කිරිබත්ගොඩ ඤාණානන්ද ස්වාමීන් වහන්සේ
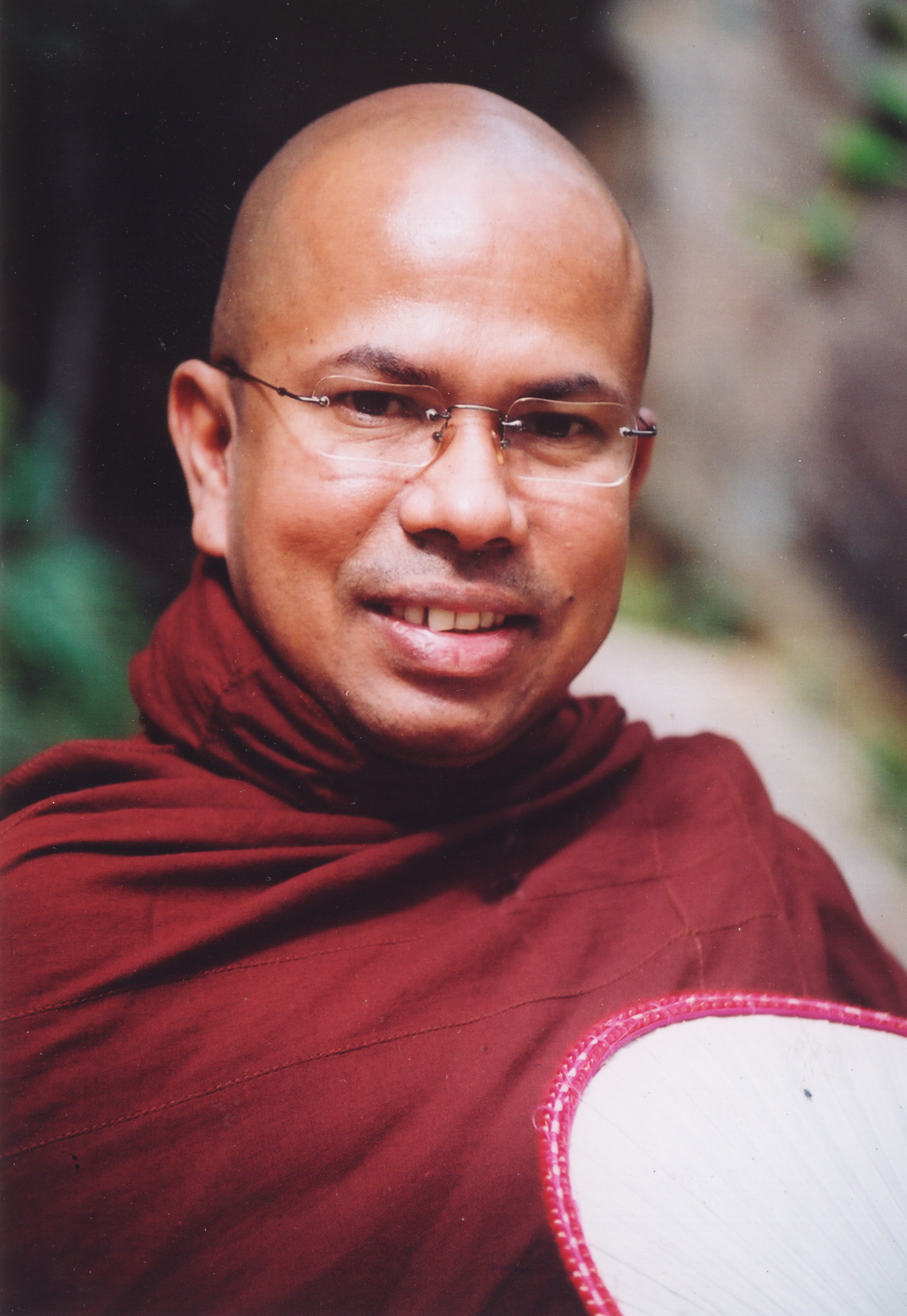
- Gnanananda Thera in or around 1999

Most Ven. Anunayaka Thera (Deputy Chief Prelate) of the Sri Kalyaniwangsa Sect of the Amarapura Nikaya
- In office August 2019 – May 2022

Founder and Chief Advisor of Mahamevnawa Maha Sangha Sabha & Mahamevnawa Buddhist Monastic Order
- In office August 1999 – To date

Founder and Chief Advisor of Shraddha TV Media Network
- In office September 2012 – To date

The Chief Representative of the Buddhist Delegation of Sri Lanka for the International Tripitaka Chanting Ceremony of Bodhgaya
- In office 2008–2010

Personal life
- Born: 1 July 1961 (age 64) Iriyawetiya, Kiribathgoda, Sri Lanka

Religious life
- Religion: Buddhism
- Order: Sri Kalyaniwangsa Nikaya
- School: Theravada
- Sect: Amarapura Nikaya

Senior posting
- Teacher: Dambagasare Sri Sumedhankara Mahanayaka Thera and Dikwelle Pannananda Thera
- Based in: Sri Lanka
- Website: https://mahamevnawa.lk

Kiribathgoda Gnanananda Thera (born: 1 July 1961) is a Sri Lankan monk. He is the founder and chief advisor of Mahamevnawa Buddhist Monastery, Mahamevnawa Maha Sangha Saba (මහමෙව්නාව මහා සංඝ සභාව) and Shraddha Media Network. Many people address Him as "Pinwath Loku Suwaminwahanse (පින්වත් ලොකු ස්වාමීන් වහන්සේ)".

== Spiritual biography ==
Gnanananda became a monk at age 17 on 26 March 1979 under Dambagasare Sumedhankara Thera and Dikwelle Pannananda Thera at Seruwavila. He received a traditional Buddhist academic education and entered the University of Sri Jayewardenepura. He founded Mahamevnawa Buddhist Monastery in August 1999 in Waduwava, Polgahawela. Mahamevnawa Buddhist Monastery now has more than 80 branch monasteries in Sri Lanka and more than 45 overseas monasteries in Canada, the United States, Australia, the United Kingdom, Germany Italy, Dubai, South Korea, India and many more.

In 2012 he started Shraddha TV and Radio with the aim of spreading the pure Dhamma. Today, it operates as the largest Buddhist media network in Sri Lanka, spanning a wide range of media including television, radio, the Internet, Buddhist magazines, web software, etc.. He also has the largest group of student monks in Sri Lanka, which is more than 1000. He has also written more than 300 Buddhist scriptures and translated the Sutta Pitaka into simple Sinhala language. Several of his books have been translated into various languages, including English, Thai, and French. He also translated the "Pirith Book" into Sinhala and English in a way that allows chanting. In addition, he took the initiative to print Buddhist scriptures in Tamil and the Bale system for the first time in Sri Lanka. In 2019, he was appointed as the Anunayaka of the Sri Kalyaniwansa Sect of the Amarapura Nikaya.

== Teachings ==
He now teaches Buddhism (Theravada), emphasising the need to practice it in pure form (i.e. as in the Sutras) and casting off what was not advocated by the Buddha.

Our Teacher, the Buddha has taught that birth as a human being is, indeed, a very rare achievement. Fortunately, we have now obtained that rare achievement. Yet, we have to remember that man's greatness does not lie either in his nationality, caste, clan or any such feature. His greatness depends solely on his conduct. Man's experiencing of happiness and suffering, too, is related to his three modes of action, namely mental, verbal and physical action.

The Buddha devoted all his life to save man from dukkha – suffering. We are followers of the Buddha and our fervent hope is to see a world full of people who are freed from dukkha.

Mankind's wonderful treasure of wisdom is the Teaching of the Buddha. This doctrine illuminates our lives bringing happiness and joy. Go in search of this wonderful Dharma yourself, lead your life accordingly, get rid of your suffering and join that fortunate band of people who experience the Supreme Bliss.

Thousands of practicing Buddhists are associated with Mahamevnawa.

Maha Sthupa Vandanawa conducted on 2 February 2008 at Ruwanwelisaya, Anuradhapura with the participation of over 100,000 disciples, Somawathi Stupa Vandanawa conducted on 8 May 2010 at Somawathiya Temple with the participation of over 1,000,000 devotees, Rankoth Vehera Maha Arahanthaka Vandanawa conducted on 18 August 2018 at Rankoth Vehera with the participation of over 600,000 disciples and Mihidhu Maha Kruthaguna Puja conducted on 5 October 2019 at Mihintale with the participation of over 800,000 devotees bear evidence for the popularity his Dhamma program has achieved.

Gnanananda reintroduced the usage of "Namo Buddhaya" to the Sri Lankan Buddhists as a way of Buddhist greeting. Also, there was a weekly Dhamma discussion program telecasted on TNL television named "Namo Buddhaya" in which Thera participated.

== Publications ==
Kiribathgoda Gnanananda Thera is considered to be the Buddhist monk who wrote the large number of Buddhist texts. Gnanananda Thera has written over 300 books based on the teachings of Buddha and also translated many Pali books like Mahavamsa and Nettipakarana. In addition, he translated the Sutta Pitaka into simple Sinhala language and he also translated the "Pirith Book" into Sinhala and English in a way that allows chanting. Besides, he took the initiative to print Buddhist scriptures in Tamil and the Bale system for the first time in Sri Lanka. This may be the first time that Buddhist books have been printed using the Bale method. These all publications are aimed to emphasise uncontaminated Buddhism that can be understood by anyone who reads it.

The Thera has also instigated a culture in Sri Lanka (traditionally known as Dhamma Dīpa – Island full of Buddha's Teachings) to teach the Buddha's teachings in the national language of Sinhala (සිංහල), even though the teachings are traditionally taught in the Pali language. Many disciples believe that they are now able to teach the Buddha's teachings with the right understanding. Many of the Buddhist scriptures he wrote have been translated into English, Hindi, Chinese, Indonesian, Vietnamese, French, Thai, Burmese, Arabic, Spanish, etc.

Below are some of the English books written by him:

- Buddha – The Marvelous Sage
- Buddhism
- The Supreme Bliss of Nibbana: Maha Satipatthana Sutta
- Dependent Origination
- Arahant Kondanna – The First Bhikkhu
- Mahamevnawa Paritta Pali-English Chanting Book
- The Wise Shall Realise
- Maha Satipatthana Sutta Pali-English Chanting Book
- This Was Said by the Buddha: Itivuttaka
- What Happens After Death? – Buddha Answers
- What Does the Buddha Really Teach? – Dhammapada
- The Voice of Enlightened Nuns – The Theri Gatha
- The Voice of Enlightened Monks – The Thera Gatha
- The Life of Buddha for Children
- Stories of Sakka, Lord of Gods
- Stories of Heavenly Mansions from the Vimanavatthu
- Stories of Ghosts from the Petavatthu
- Stories of Brahmas from the Brahma Samyutta
