= Mahamevnawa Buddhist Monastery =

Sri Lankan Buddhist monastic organisation

- Logo of the Mahamevnawa Meditation Monastery Network
- Abbreviation: MBM
- Formation: 14 August 1999; 27 years ago
- Founder: Kiribathgoda Gnanananda Thero
- Type: Buddhist monastic organisation
- Headquarters: Polgahawela, Sri Lanka
- Region served: Worldwide
- Chief advisor: Kiribathgoda Gnanananda Thero
- Affiliations: Amarapura Sri Kalyanivamsa Nikaya
- Website: mahamevnawa.lk/en/

The Mahamevnawa Buddhist Monastery (MBM), also known as the Mahamevnawa Meditation Monastery Network, is a Theravada Buddhist monastic organisation of Sri Lankan origin. It was founded in 1999 by the monk Kiribathgoda Gnanananda Thero, who remains its chief advisor. The headquarters are in Polgahawela in the North Western Province.

The organisation runs around 130 monasteries and meditation centres, of which more than 80 are in Sri Lanka and the rest are overseas. It also operates a group of monasteries for nuns, a television and radio network, a publishing house and several schools. The organisation is reported to be one of the largest Theravada Buddhist monastic networks in South Asia.

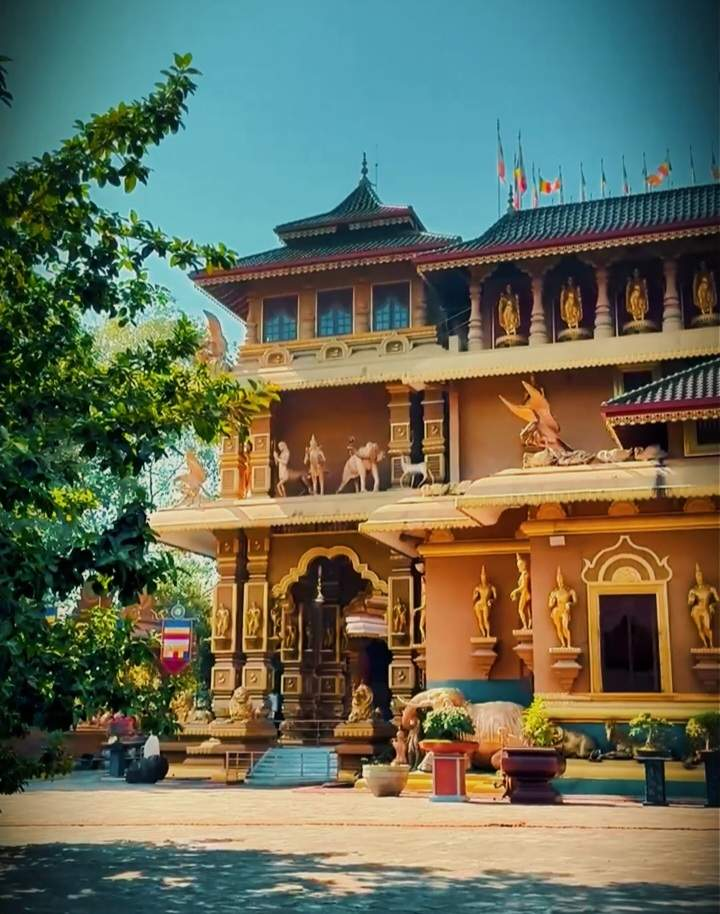
The Siri Gautama Sambuddharaja Maligawa at the Mahamevnawa headquarters in Polgahawela

== History ==
Mahamevnawa was established on 14 August 1999 at Polgahawela by Kiribathgoda Gnanananda Thero. Over the following years it opened branch monasteries in every province of Sri Lanka. The first overseas centre was set up in Toronto, Canada, and further branches followed in the United States, Australia, the United Kingdom, India, South Korea, Japan, Germany, Italy, the United Arab Emirates and other countries.

In 2012 the organisation launched a Buddhist television channel, Shraddha TV. A radio station, Shraddha Radio, was added later.

== Organisation ==
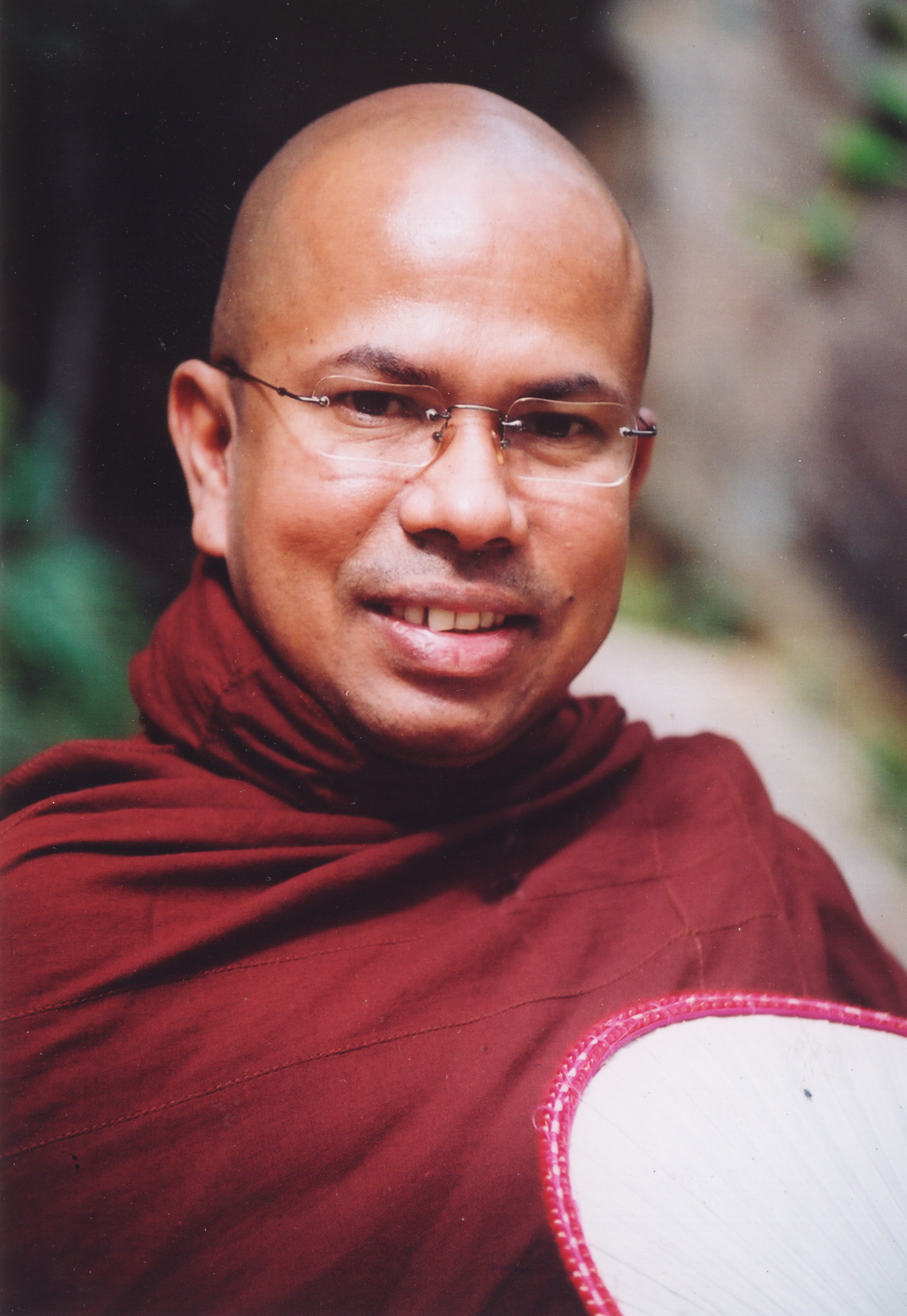
Kiribathgoda Gnanananda Thero, founder of Mahamevnawa

The monks of Mahamevnawa belong to the Amarapura Sri Kalyanivamsa Nikaya, and the monastic community is formally constituted as the Mahamevnawa Maha Sangha Council of that nikaya. The Mahanayaka of the nikaya serves as chief preceptor for the community. Dodampahala Chandrasiri Mahanayaka Thero held this role from 2004 to 2022, and Devinuwara Sirisunanda Mahanayaka Thero has held it since 2024. Hiniduma Nandarathana Nayaka Thero has also served as a preceptor since 2022.

According to the organisation, more than 1,000 monks and more than 100 nuns live in its monasteries.

=== Anagarika monasteries ===
The monasteries for nuns are known as Mahamevnawa Anagarika Monasteries. There are more than ten of them, with headquarters at Muthugala in Dambadeniya, and about 100 nuns live and practise there. Two further nuns' monasteries operate overseas, in Melbourne and Toronto.

== Teachings and practice ==
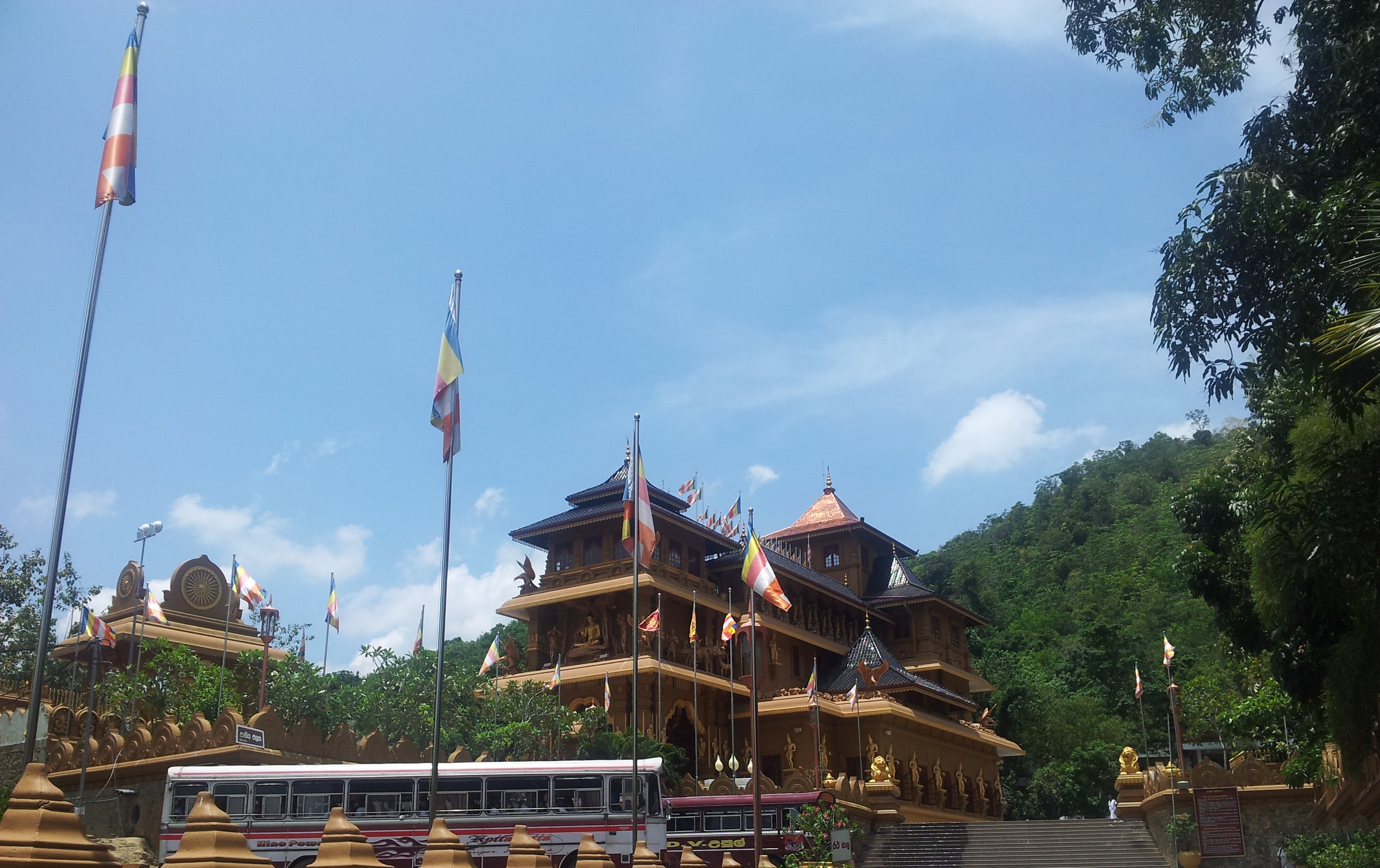
Mahamevnawa Monastery, Polgahawela

Monks of Mahamevnawa

Mahamevnawa states that its purpose is to teach, discuss and practise the Dhamma in what it regards as its unaltered form. Its teaching holds that knowledge of the Buddha's words is the first step towards the ending of suffering (dukkha) and the attainment of Nibbana. The monasteries offer instruction in meditation, with an emphasis on developing concentration and wisdom through mindfulness (sati). The organisation says that its monks preach in the manner set out by the Buddha.

== Media and publications ==
Publications of Mahamevnawa Sadaham Prakashana

The organisation's publishing arm, Mahamevnawa Sadaham Prakashana (Mahamevnawa Dhamma Publications), issues books and recorded sermons. Most of this material is in Sinhala, and some of it has been translated into English.

Shraddha TV and Shraddha Radio are operated by the Shraddha Media Network, which is based at the Mahamevnawa Bodhinnana Meditation Monastery in Kaduwela.

== Education ==
Mahamevnawa Buddhist College is a group of semi-government private schools run under the guidance of the organisation's monks. The organisation describes it as the first Buddhist school to be established in Sri Lanka after independence. There are four campuses:

- Demalagama, Delgoda
- Sandalankawa
- Welimada
- Malabe

== Criticism ==
Mahamevnawa has been criticised on the grounds that its monks do not complete the traditional pirivena education that is customary for Buddhist monks in Sri Lanka. Critics say that the founder set this tradition aside so that the number of monks could be increased quickly.

== Branches ==
=== Sri Lanka ===
The following branches are listed by the organisation.

==== North Western Province ====
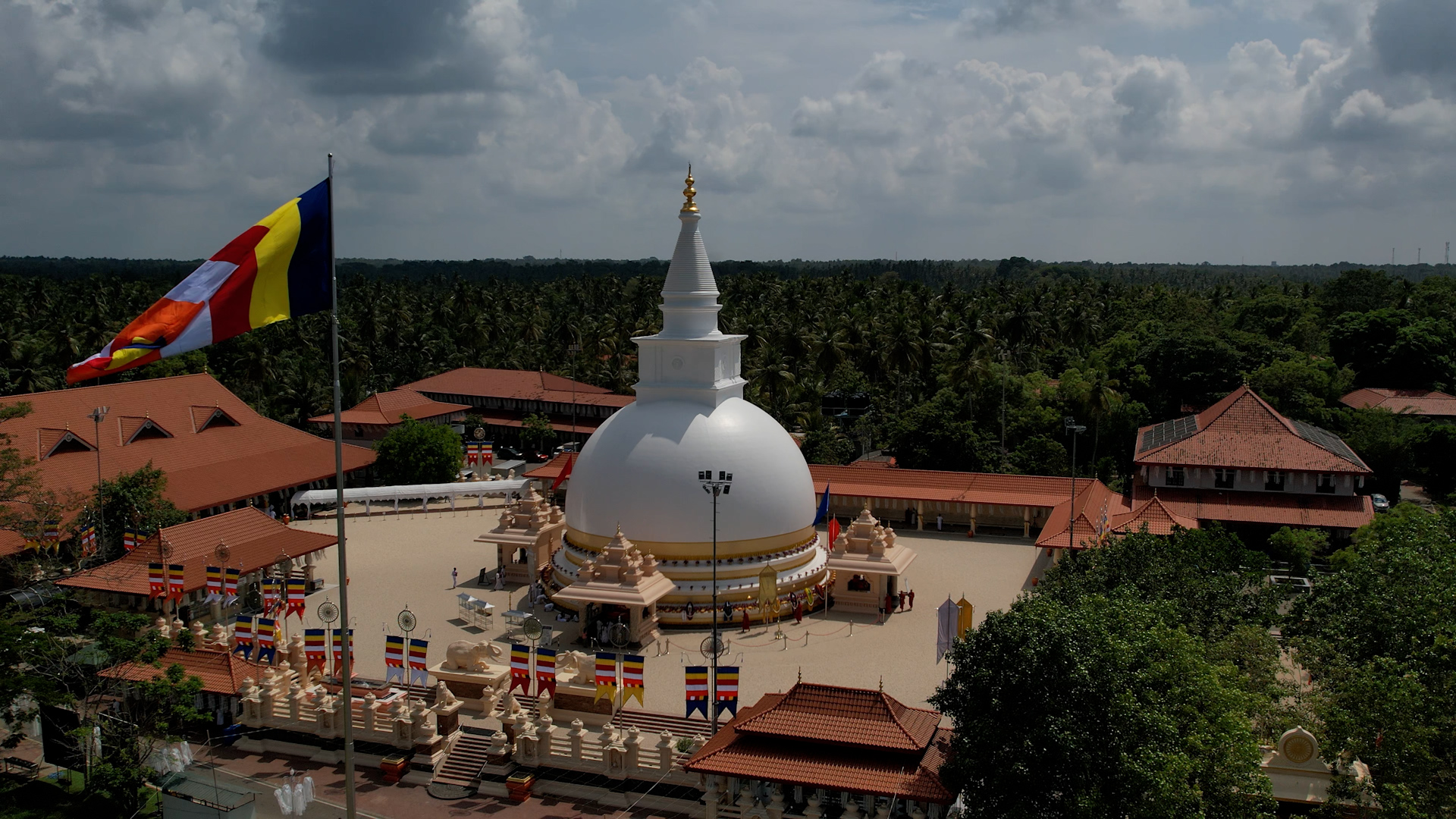
The Sri Angulimala Maha Stupa at the Mahamevnawa monastery in Bowatta

- Mahamevnawa Buddhist Monastery, Polgahawela (headquarters)
- Mahamevnawa Buddhist Monastery, Anamaduwa
- Mahamevnawa Buddhist Monastery, Ibbagamuwa
- Mahamevnawa Buddhist Monastery, Uyandana
- Mahamevnawa Tisarana Sarana Samadhi Buddhist Monastery, Giribawa
- Mahamevnawa Buddhist Monastery, Tambakanda
- Mahamevnawa Buddhist Monastery, Pothuhera
- Mahamevnawa Buddhist Monastery, Polpitigama
- Sri Angulimala Maha Stupa Temple, Bowatta
- Mahamevnawa Buddhist Monastery, Maho
- Mahamevnawa Buddhist Monastery, Maspotha
- Mahamevnawa Buddhist Monastery, Dambadeniya

==== Western Province ====
- Mahamevnawa Amawathura Monastery, Malabe
- Mahamevnawa Bodhinnana Meditation Monastery, Kaduwela
- Mahamevnawa Buddhist Monastery, Avissawella
- Mahamevnawa Thisarana Meditation Monastery (Mahamevnawa Buddha Gaya Maha Vihara), Kochchikade
- Mahamevnawa Buddhist Monastery (Colombo Dhamma Friends Buddhist Temple), Kotte
- Nedungamuwa Mahamevnawa Buddhist Monastery, Gampaha
- Mahamevnawa Buddhist Monastery, Bulathsinhala
- Mahamevnawa Buddhist Monastery, Serupita
- Mahamevnawa Buddhist Monastery, Hunumulla
- Mahamevnawa Buddhist Monastery, Horana
- Mahamevnawa Buddhist Monastery, Nittambuwa
- Siri Gautama Buddhist Temple, Mavaramandiya (chief incumbent: Polpitimukalane Pangnnasiri Thero)
- Mahamevnawa Buddhist Monastery, Palugama, Dompe
- Mahamevnawa Gilan Bhikkhu Hospital, Bombuwala (a hospital for sick monks)

==== Southern Province ====
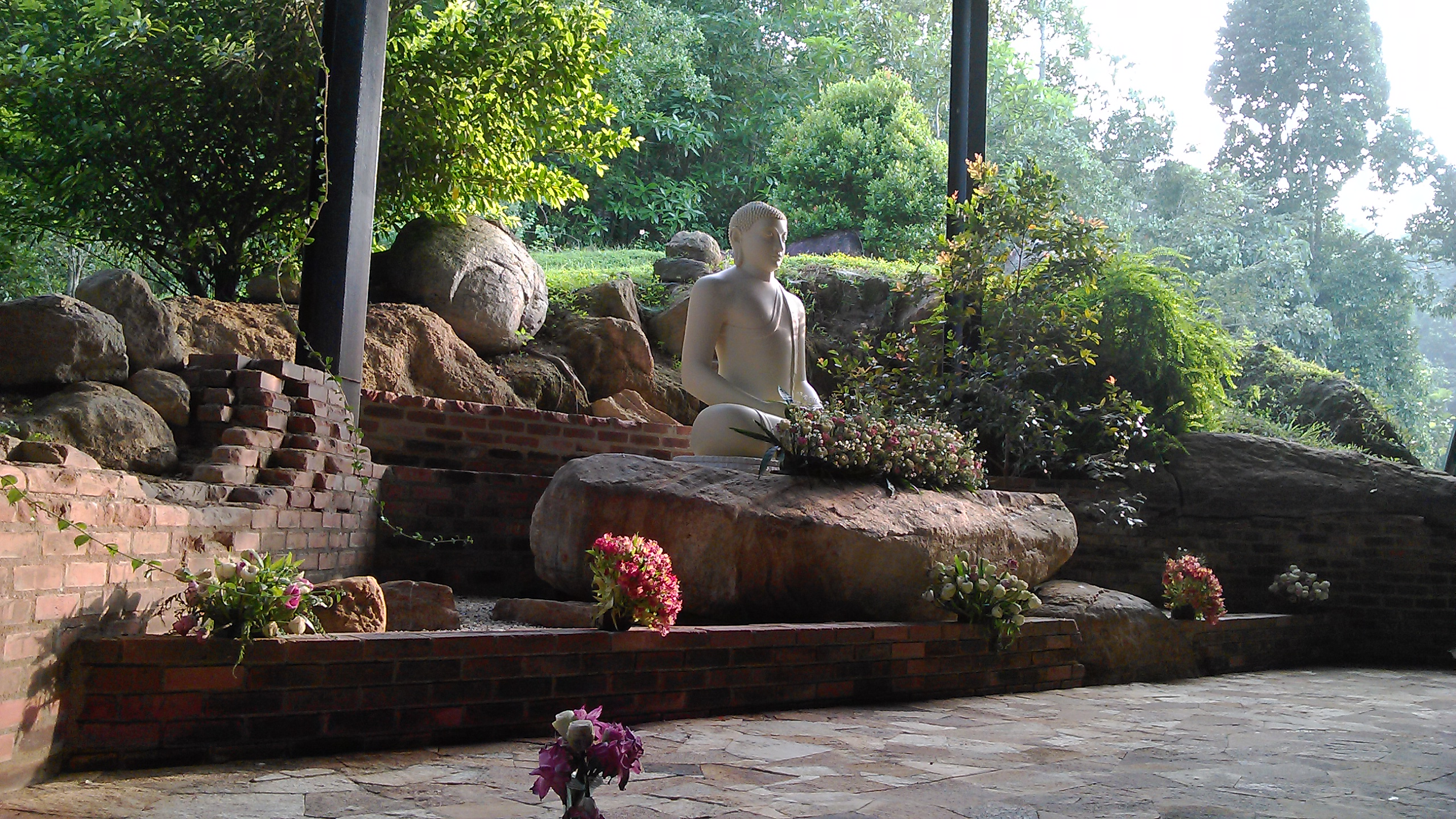
Samadhi Buddha statue in the Dhamma hall of the Mahamevnawa Maha Vihara, Matara

- Mahamevnawa Maha Vihara, Matara
- Mahamevnawa Meditation Monastery, Galle
- Mahamevnawa Meditation Monastery (Sri Rahula Maha Stupa Temple), Elpitiya
- Mahamevnawa Buddhist Monastery, Walasmulla
- Mahamevnawa Buddhist Monastery, Suriyawewa
- Mahamevnawa Buddhist Monastery, Hiniduma
- Mahamevnawa Meditation Monastery, Pannegamuwa, Tissamaharama
- Mahamevnawa Buddhist Monastery, Beliatta

==== Central Province ====
- Mahamevnawa Buddhist Monastery, Kundasale, Kandy
- Mahamevnawa Buddhist Monastery, Madawala Ulpatha, Matale
- Mahamevnawa Sariputta Forest Monastery, Rattota
- Mahamevnawa Buddhist Monastery, Nuwara Eliya
- Mahamevnawa Sri Mahasena Forest Monastery, Moragahakanda
- Mahamevnawa Buddhist Monastery, Laggala
- Mahamevnawa Buddhist Monastery, Poramadulla
- Mahamevnawa Buddhist Monastery, Pundaluoya

==== Uva Province ====
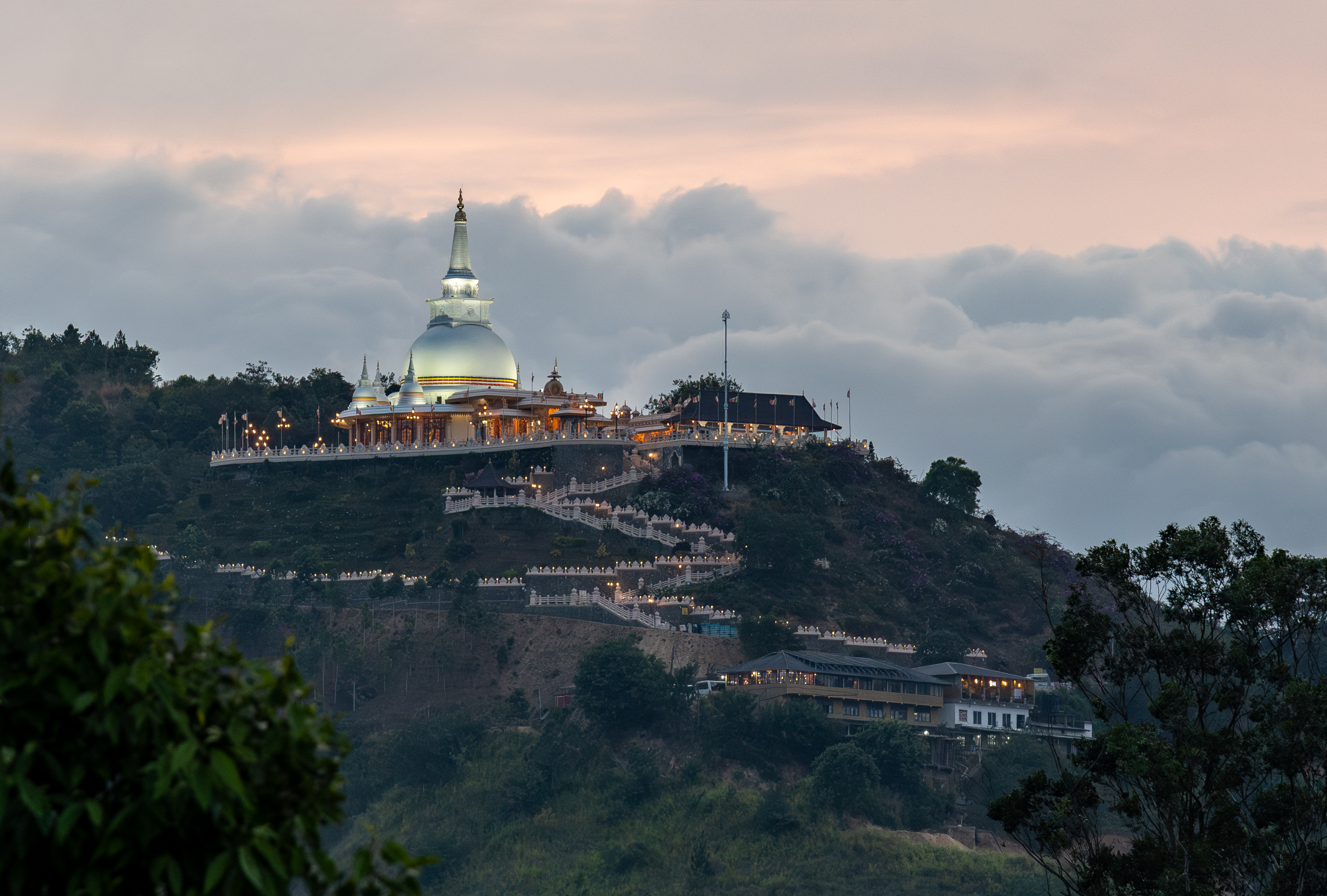
The Sri Satbudhu Maha Seya (Great Stupa of the Seven Buddhas) at the Mahamevnawa monastery in Kumbalwela, Ella

- Mahamevnawa Amasisila Meditation Monastery, Kataragama
- Mahamevnawa Buddhist Monastery, Bandarawela, Ella
- Mahamevnawa Buddhist Monastery, Bibila
- Mahamevnawa Meditation Monastery, Buttala
- Mahamevnawa Sri Maha Sumana Meditation Monastery, Mahiyanganaya
- Mahamevnawa Daharakina-Kanda Forest Monastery, Mariarawa
- Mahamevnawa Buddhist Monastery, Mullegama
- Mahamevnawa Buddhist Monastery, Monaragala
- Mahamevnawa Buddhist Monastery, Welimada
- Mahamevnawa Buddhist Monastery, Siyambalanduwa

==== North Central Province ====
- Mahamevnawa Dhammachetiya Buddhist Monastery, Anuradhapura
- Siri Vāsawa Meditation Garden of Dhammachetiya Monastery, Anuradhapura
- Mahamevnawa Meditation Monastery, Mihintale
- Sri Ananda Maha Se Vihara, Galnewa
- Mahamevnawa Meditation Hermitage, Polonnaruwa
- Mahamevnawa Sri Bodhiraja Forest Monastery, Habarana
- Mahamevnawa Bhathiyagiri Forest Monastery (Bhatiyagiri Rajamaha Vihara), Kebitigollawa
- Mahamevnawa Dhammagiri Forest Monastery, Kahatagasdigiliya
- Mahamevnawa Sadaham Senasuna Monastery, Galenbindunuwewa

==== Sabaragamuwa Province ====
- Mahamevnawa Buddhist Monastery, Eratna
- Mahamevnawa Meditation Monastery, Kahawatta
- Mahamevnawa Meditation Monastery, Balangoda
- Mahamevnawa Meditation Monastery, Siripagama
- Mahamevnawa Amadahara Meditation Monastery, Pinnawala
- Mahamevnawa Forest Monastery, Kukulegama
- Mahamevnawa Nidhangala Forest Monastery, Kalawana

==== Eastern Province ====
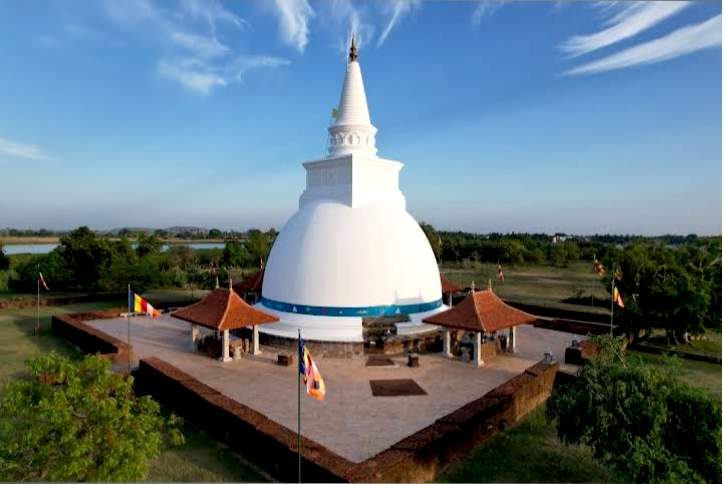
The ancient Somawathi Stupa at the Wilgamwehera Raja Maha Vihara in Seruwila

- Mahamevnawa Sri Saddhatissa Meditation Monastery, Ampara
- Mahamevnawa Dhammagiri Meditation Monastery, Kantale
- Wilgamwehera Somavathi Raja Maha Vihara, Seruwila
- Seruwawila Mangala Raja Maha Vihara (affiliated temple; chief incumbent: Aludeniye Subodhi Thero)
- Mahamevnawa Sadaham Mandiraya meditation hall, Padiyathalawa

=== International ===
The following overseas branches are listed by the organisation. Unless noted otherwise, each is named Mahamevnawa Meditation Monastery.

==== Canada ====
- Toronto
- Winnipeg
- Saskatoon
- Edmonton
- Vancouver
- Acton, Ontario

==== United States ====
- Washington, D.C. (Mahamevnawa Bhavana Monastery)
- New Jersey
- California
- Florida
- New York
- Houston, Texas (Lone Star Buddhist Meditation Center of Mahamevnawa)
- Atlanta

==== Australia and New Zealand ====
- Adelaide
- Melbourne
- West Melbourne (Mahamevnawa Meditation Hermitage)
- Melbourne (Mahamevnawa Jetawana Meditation Monastery)
- Perth
- Sydney
- Brisbane
- Auckland, New Zealand (Mahamevnawa Meditation Hermitage)

==== Europe ====
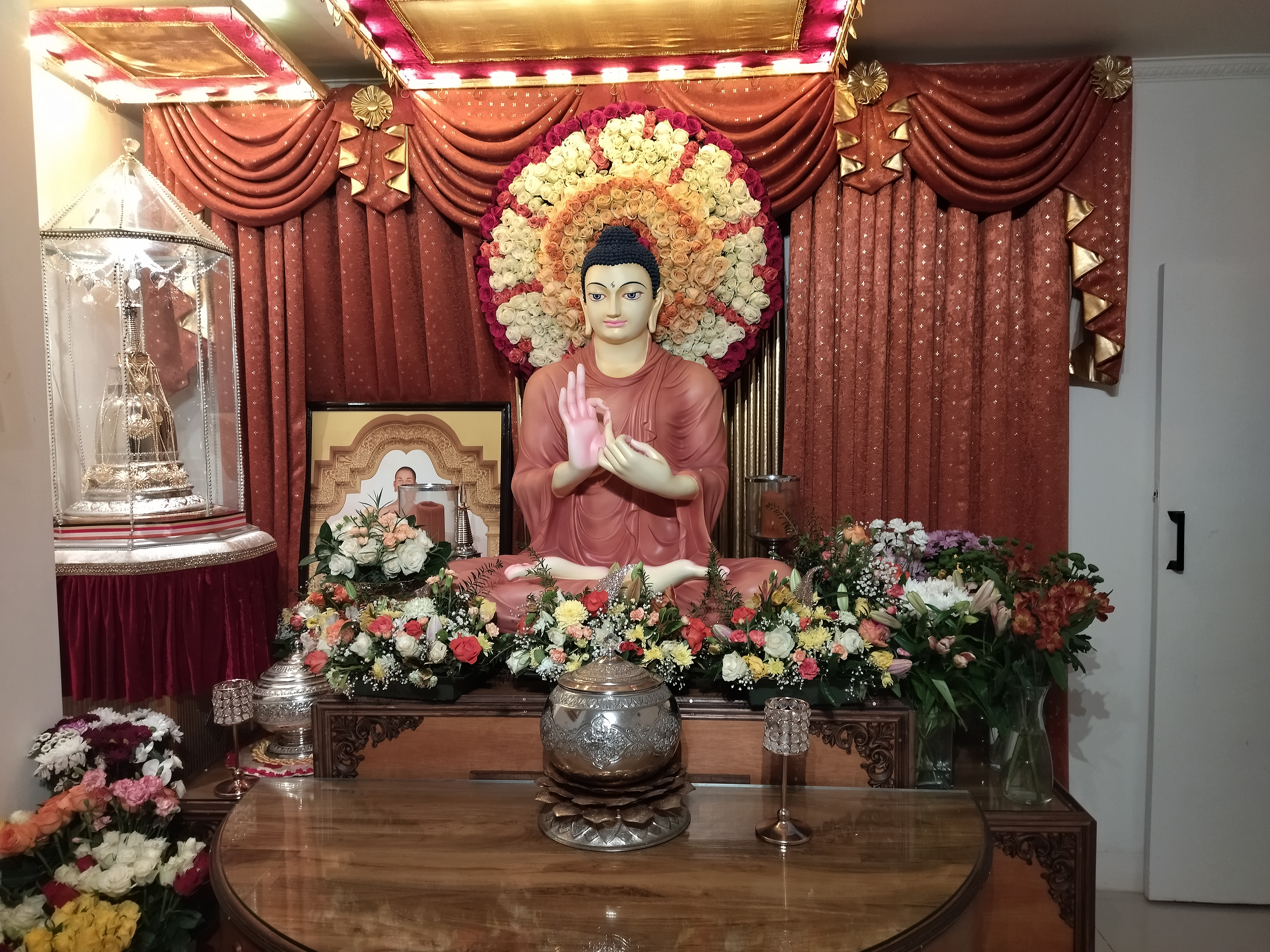
Mahamevnawa monastery in London

- Basildon, Essex, United Kingdom
- Liverpool and Warrington, United Kingdom
- Stanmore, London, United Kingdom
- South Wales, United Kingdom (Isipathana Meditation Monastery)
- Dundee, Scotland, United Kingdom
- Axbridge, England, United Kingdom (Mahamevnawa Meditation Centre)
- Esher, England, United Kingdom (Mahamevnawa Buddhist Monastery)
- Kilshanchoe, County Kildare, Ireland
- Paris, France
- Offenbach, Frankfurt am Main, Germany
- Rozzano, Milan, Italy
- Amsterdam and Utrecht, Netherlands
- Nicosia, Cyprus
- Limassol, Cyprus

==== India ====
- Mahamevnawa Buddhgayan Ashram, Bodh Gaya
- Mahamevnawa Buddhist Monastery, Nagpur
- Buddha Rashmi Mahamevnawa Theravada Buddhist Training Centre, Bhivkund, Maharashtra
- Mahamevnawa Buddhist Monastery, Delhi
- Mahamevnawa Buddhist Monastery, Ghaziabad
- Mahamevnawa Buddhist Monastery, Buldhana, Maharashtra

==== East Asia ====
- Ansan, South Korea
- Daegu, South Korea
- Gimhae, South Korea
- Osaka, Japan (Mahamevnawa Buddhist Monastery)
- Ibaraki, Japan (Mahamevnawa Buddhist Monastery)

==== Middle East ====
- Mahamevnawa Buddhist Temple, Dubai, United Arab Emirates

=== Anagarika nuns' monasteries ===
The following nuns' monasteries are listed by the organisation.

==== Sri Lanka ====
- Mahamevnawa Anagarika Nuns Monastery, Muthugala, Dambadeniya (headquarters)
- Siri Yashodhara Maha Stupa Temple (Mahamevnawa Anagarika Nuns Monastery), Udupila
- Colombo Buddhist Nuns Monastery
- Mahamevnawa Anagarika Monastery, Nugegoda
- Mahamevnawa Anagarika Nuns Monastery, Warakapola
- Mahamevnawa Anagarika Nuns Monastery, Kimbulapitiya
- Mahamevnawa Anagarika Nuns Monastery, Hakmana
- Mahamevnawa Swarnamali Anagarika Nuns Monastery, Anuradhapura
- Mahamevnawa Anagarika Nuns Monastery, Chilaw
- Mahamevnawa Anagarika Nuns Monastery, Mawatagama
- Mahamevnawa Anagarika Nuns Monastery, Kadugannawa
- Mahamevnawa Anagarika Nuns Monastery, Kuliyapitiya

==== Overseas ====
- Mahamevnawa Buddhist Nuns Monastery, Melbourne, Australia
- Mahamevnawa Buddhist Nuns Monastery, Toronto, Canada

== See also ==
- Kiribathgoda Gnanananda Thero
- Shraddha TV
- Buddhism in Sri Lanka
