= Suranimala =

Sinhalese Soldier

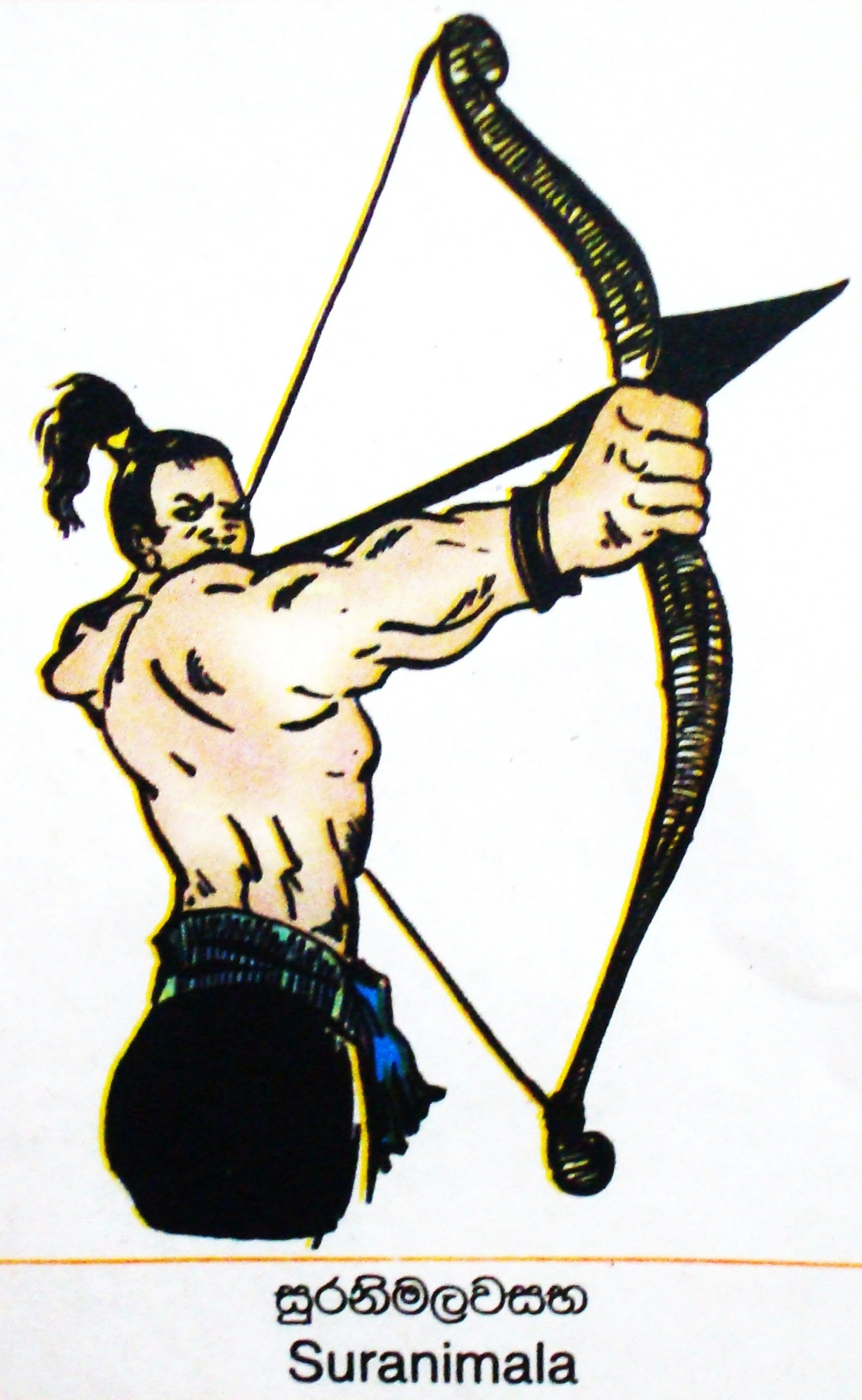
- Born: Nimala
- Other names: Nirmala, Suranimilawasabha
- Known for: One of the ten giant warriors, second in command of king Dutugemunu's army

Suranimala was a Sinhalese soldier in the 2nd century BCE. He was the second in command of King Dutugemunu’s army, and among ten of his best warriors known as ten giant warriors. He made an immense contribution to King Dutugemunu's victory over King Elara. He is said to have been a highly skilled swordsman and his preferred weapon was a 'Utum Kaduva' (Great sword).

== Early life ==
Named by his parents as Nimala, he was the youngest of seven children. His father was known as Samgha, the village headman of Khandakavitthika in Kotthivala. Although said to have had the strength equal to that of ten elephants, in his younger days Nimala preferred to stay idle at home while his brothers worked in the family’s paddy fields. When an order was issued by the King to send one male to serve in his army, Nimala’s brothers picked him to be sent, feeling that he was no use to the family. After joining a company south of the Mahaweli River under a prince named Digabhaya, Nimala was sent on an errand to deliver a message to a Brahmin. Having set off at dawn, Nimala is said to have finished the journey in a few hours, covering a distance of thirty four leagues. Astounded at this feat, the Brahmin had him sent to King Kavantissa to serve directly under him. After meeting the king, Nimala was ordered to sharpen some swords as a test, which he performed extremely well. The king was impressed by his skills, and Nimala was taken to serve under the king, and became one of the ten giant warriors who were the chief commanders and champions of the king’s army.

== Being named as Suranimala ==
After King Kavantissa’s death, his successor and son Dutugemunu began the war against the South Indian King Elara who was then in control of the Anuradhapura Kingdom. Elara’s forces were gradually defeated and Dutugemunu’s forces approached Anuradhapura, where the final battle would take place. As a test before the final battle, the king addressed his men and asked them men to drink from a large vessel of toddy. Seeing that none accepted this challenge, Nimala drank all the toddy emptied the vessel. After this incident he was known as Suranimala, the word sura meaning liquor.

== Battle of Vijithapura ==
Suranimala played a key role in the decisive battle for one of King Elara’s last strongholds, the fortress of Vijithapura. Along with Nandimitra and the King’s elephant, he attacked the southern gate of the fortress. Not desiring to enter the fortress from the opening the Elephant had made, he leaped over the wall. Once inside, he is said to have fought the enemy using a large sword. He also defeated king Elara’s champion Dighajantu, thus saving Dutugemunu whom Dighajantu was seeking to kill. This event ultimately led to the retreat of king Elara’s forces and Elara’s death at the hands of Dutugemunu. At this final battle, Suranimala stood on king Dutugemunu's left, protecting him. Soon after the defeat of Elara, king Dutugemunu’s forces had to fight another battle against Bhalluka, a cousin of Elara. Suranimala along with the ten giants played a key part here as well.
