= Gotabhaya =

Gotabhaya, Gothabhaya or Gotabaya (Sinhala: ගෝඨාභය gōṭhābhaya) is a male given name with roots in the Sinhalese language of Sri Lanka.

Notable bearers of the name include:

- Gothabhaya, Prince of Ruhuna (r. 2nd century BC), a monarch of the ancient Kingdom of Ruhuna of Sri Lanka.
- Gothabhaya of Anuradhapura (r. 249–262 AD), a monarch of the ancient Anuradhapura kingdom of Sri Lanka.
- Gotabaya Rajapaksa, 8th President of Sri Lanka from 2019 to 2022.
- Richard Gotabhaya Senanayake, a former Sri Lankan politician and son of Fredrick Richard Senanayake
- Theraputthabhya, one of the Ten Giant Warriors of Dutthagamani, whose childhood name was Gothabhaya.
