= Viharamahadevi =

Queen of the Kingdom of Ruhuna

Queen Viharamaha Devi
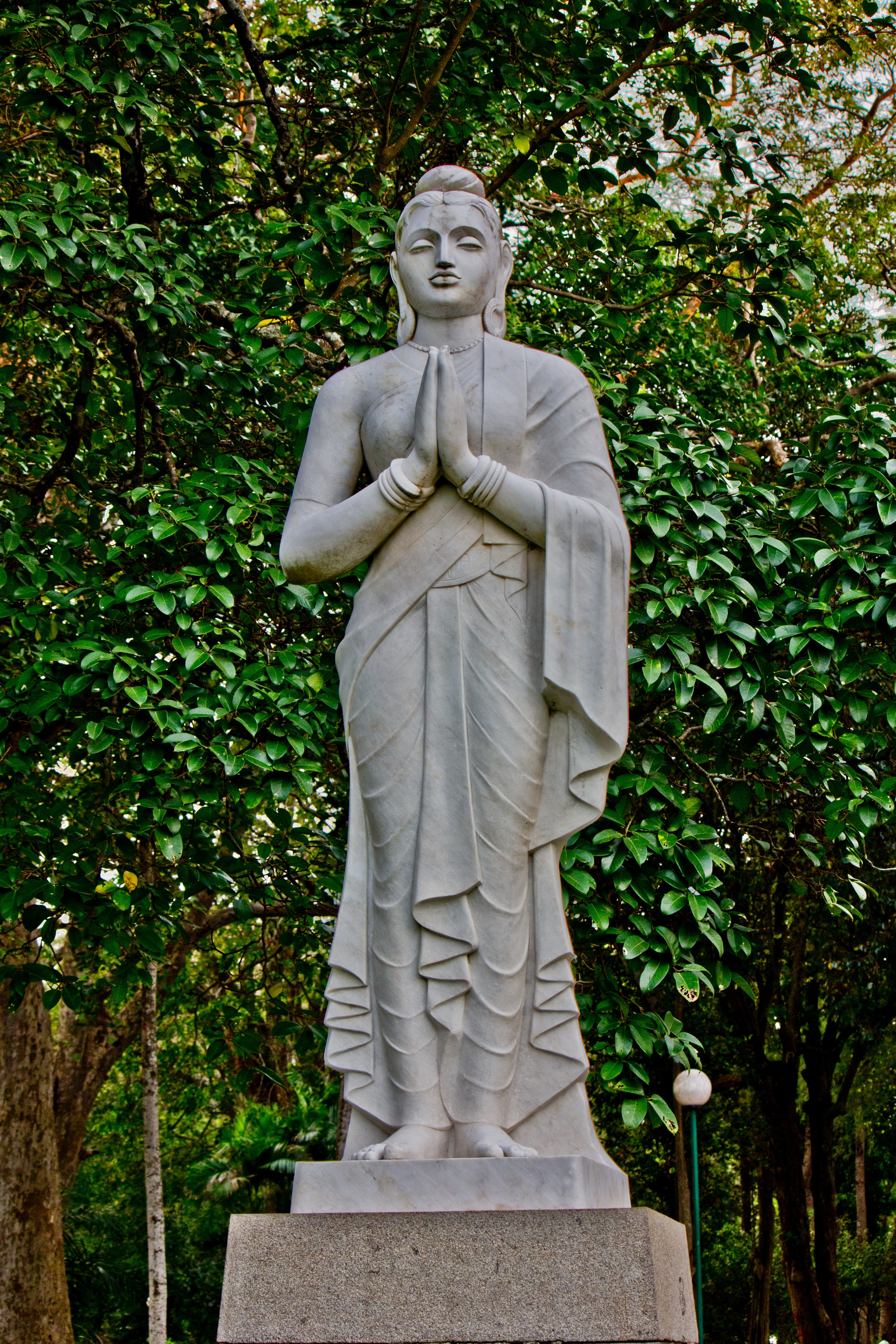
- Statue of Queen Viharamahadevi
- Tenure: 205 BC - 161 BC
- Born: Kelaniya
- Spouse: Kavan Tissa
- Issue: Dutugamunu; Saddha Tissa
- Father: Kelani Tissa (Tissa of Kelaniya)
- Religion: Theravāda Buddhism

Viharamahadevi (Sinhala:විහාරමහාදේවි) was the mother of King Dutugamunu, Saddhatissa and the Queen consort of King Kavantissa (King of the Ruhuna Sri Lanka). Some scholars suggest that her original name was 'śavera', which possibly means goddess of the night.

== Life ==
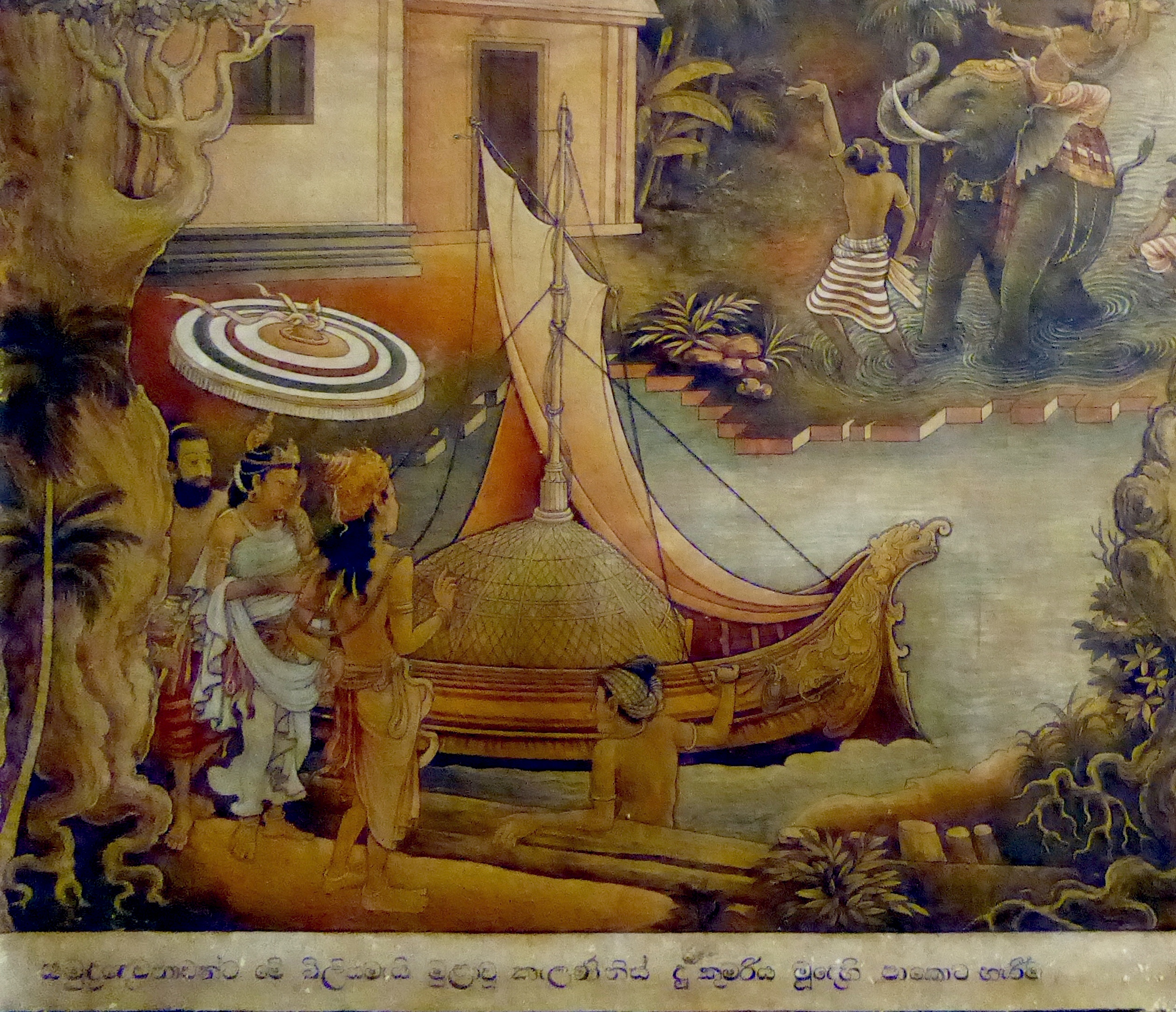
Princess Devi enters the Sacrificial Boat

Queen Viharamahadevi was the daughter of King Kelanitissa who ruled Kelaniya. The king once punished an innocent monk by boiling him alive in a cauldron of oil. It is said that the gods, angered over this cruel deed, made the ocean rush inland and flood the land. Soothsayers said that if a princess was sacrificed to the sea, the raging waves would stop. The young princess was placed inside a beautifully decorated boat which bore the letters Daughter of a King and set adrift on the sea.

It is said that as soon as she was sent off, the sea suddenly turned calm again and the water receded. However, the king was very upset, the queen was wailing and the citizens were very angry over the loss of their brave princess. They all started blaming the king.

Meanwhile, the young princess finally reached the shore, at a spot known as Dovera in Kirinda, in the southern part of the country, then known as Rohana (now Ruhuna) which was a quite prosperous area ruled by King Kavantissa. A fisherman who first spotted the boat is said to have run to the castle, and informed the king about the castaway princess. The Thupavamsa says birds who first spotted the floating boat informed the king.

The princess was brought before the king in a procession. The king, on hearing her story, was so impressed that he decided to marry the princess who had been so brave and patriotic to sacrifice her life for her country. As a part of the legend it's said as she reached the shore at a spot close to the Lanka Vihara, she was named Viharamahadevi. The place where she landed is marked with an inscription laid there by Prince Mahanaga.

She bore the king two sons, Dutugemunu and Saddhatissa. The former is one of the greatest heroes of Sri Lanka, while Viharamahadevi herself is recognised as a great heroine of Sri Lanka. She convinced her son Dutugamunu to fight, and defend the kingdom from invasion.

== See also ==
- Viharamahadevi Park
