= Neelagiriseya =

Neelagiri Maha Seya
- නීලගිරි මහා සෑය
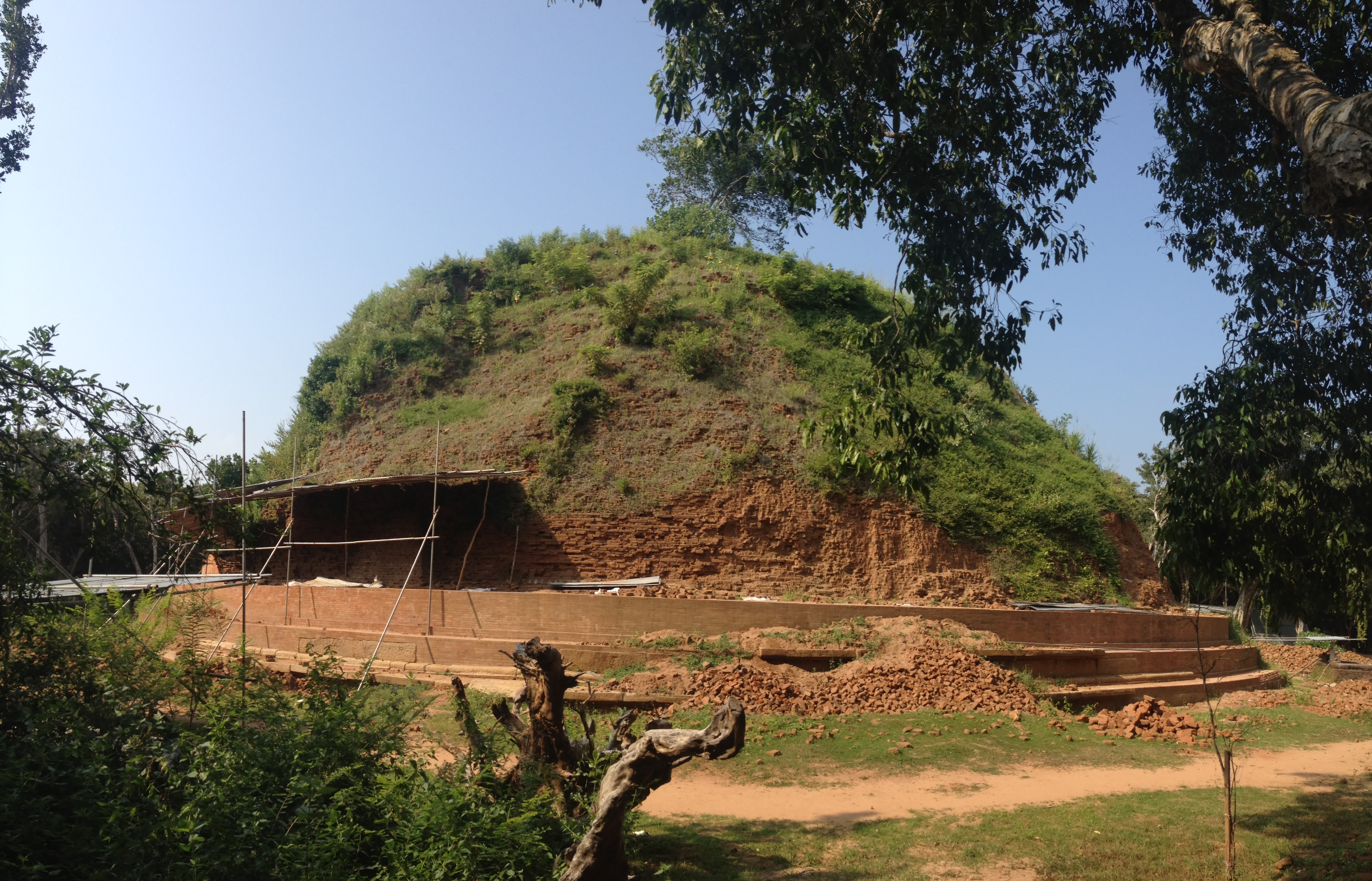

Religion
- Affiliation: Buddhism
- District: Ampara
- Province: Eastern Province

Location
- Location: Lahugala, Sri Lanka
- Interactive map of Neelagiri Maha Seya
- Coordinates: 06°51′03.0″N 81°42′06.3″E

Architecture
- Type: Buddhist Temple
- Founder: King Kavan Tissa (205–161 BC) or King Bhathikabaya (20-9 BC)
- Archaeological Protected Monument of Sri Lanka
- Designated: 10 October 2014

Neelagiriseya (Sinhalaː නීලගිරිසෑය) is an ancient colossal Stupa situated in Lahugala, Ampara District, Sri Lanka. It is the largest Buddhist Stupa in the Eastern Province of the country. It has a circumference of 182 m (597 ft) and 22 m (72 ft) height in the current status. In the recent history the Stupa and its monastery site had been neglected and abandoned over three decades as the rise of activities of military organization LTTE (Tamil Tigers) in the area.

== History ==
Neelagiriseya is believed to be built by either King Kavan Tissa (205–161 BC) or King Bhathikabaya (20-9 BC) and has been called as Uttara Seevali Pabbata Viharaya in ancient times. According to an inscription belongs to the 1st century, found during the archaeological excavations done in 2011, describes about a grant to the temple by the Maharaajinee Chula Sivalee Queen, wife of the King Bhatikabaya. In historical resources Bhatikabaya is described as a viceroy, who reigned in Ruhuna when King Kutakanna Tissa (42-20 BC) was ruling the country. Another inscription recovered from the site in 2011 excavation, also reveals about donations made by king Jettatissa I (263–273) or by the King Jettatissa II (328-337 CE).

The first reference about the Nilgiriseya in modern history could be found in the early decades of the 20th century. A.M. Horcart, who had visited this place in 1928, has published some details about the Stupa after 2 years later of his journey.

== Restoration ==
Efforts to restore the Stupa were carried out by the archaeological department during 1979 – 1984 time period. But the initiatives were abandoned as the increase of threats from Tamil Tigers separatists in the area. Since then any development or conservation activities haven't taken place for this site till defeat of LTTE in 2009. In 2011 a survey was carried out as a pre-requisite of the proposed restoration of the Stupa by a team consisted of 13 archaeologists, funded by the department of archaeology.

During the survey archaeologist identified remains of an ancient aramic complex surrounding the Stupa extending about 36 hectares. The complex includes a central Stupa with irregularly scattered ruins of the buildings, boundary walls and ponds associated with it. They have also found a golden casket with relics in Stupa among the many items found from their excavations. According to the archaeologists, the relics recovered from Neelagiriseya, are the relics of Buddha due to inscription on the casket.

== See also ==
- Ancient stupas of Sri Lanka

== Notes ==
- "PART I : SECTION (I) — GENERAL Government Notifications" (PDF). The Gazette of the Democratic Socialist Republic of Sri Lanka. 1884. 10 October 2014. Archived from the original (PDF) on 22 June 2019.
