= Winds of Sinhala =

1982 novel by Colin De Silva

The Winds of Sinhala
- Book cover
- Author: Colin De Silva
- Language: English
- Genre: Historical Fiction, Novel
- Publisher: Grafton
- Publication date: 1982
- Publication place: Sri Lanka
- Media type: Print (hardback and paperback)
- Pages: 514 pp (first edition, hardback)
- ISBN: 0-586-05648-3 (second edition, paperback)

The Winds of Sinhala is a historical novel, written by Sri Lankan novelist Colin De Silva, and published in 1982. The story is set in Sri Lanka in the 2nd century BC and is a fictionalized take on the historical events surrounding the Sri Lankan King Dutugemunu's campaign to defeat the foreign Chola King Elara, and reunify Sri Lanka under native rule.

== Plot summary ==
The story is written as the personal account of the fictional character, Prince Rodana. The narrative follows the life of Rodana, and in particular his connection as personal advisor and close friend to Prince Gamini, the future King Dutugemunu. The novel weaves together Gamini's ruthless ambition to reunite Sri Lanka, the story of his military campaign, and his romantic relationship with a woman named Raji.
