= Ten Giant Warriors =

Warriors serving King Dutugemunu

Much is written of the war of 205 BC to 161 BC between Sinhala King Dutugemunu and Ellalan for the city of Anuradhapura, and the central role played by Dutugemunu's Ten Giant Warriors or Ten Great Giants (Sinhala: දසමහා යෝධයෝ, romanized: dasamahā yodhayo). According to the chronicle Mahavamsa the men were drafted into Royal service during the reign of Dutugemunu's father, King Kavantissa.

The Rajavaliya asserts that the ten warriors had remained impartial throughout Dutugemunu's battles with his younger brother Tissa, as they had promised King Kavantissa that they would remain impartial in the event of a dispute between the two brothers. At the decisive battle between the two kings at Vijithapura, Nandhimitra and Nirmalaya (Suranimala) are said to have fought to secure the south gate to the city. Mahasona (sena), Gothaimbara and Theraputtabhya are said to have secured the east gate, while the remaining champions fought for the north and west gates.

== Nandhimithra ==
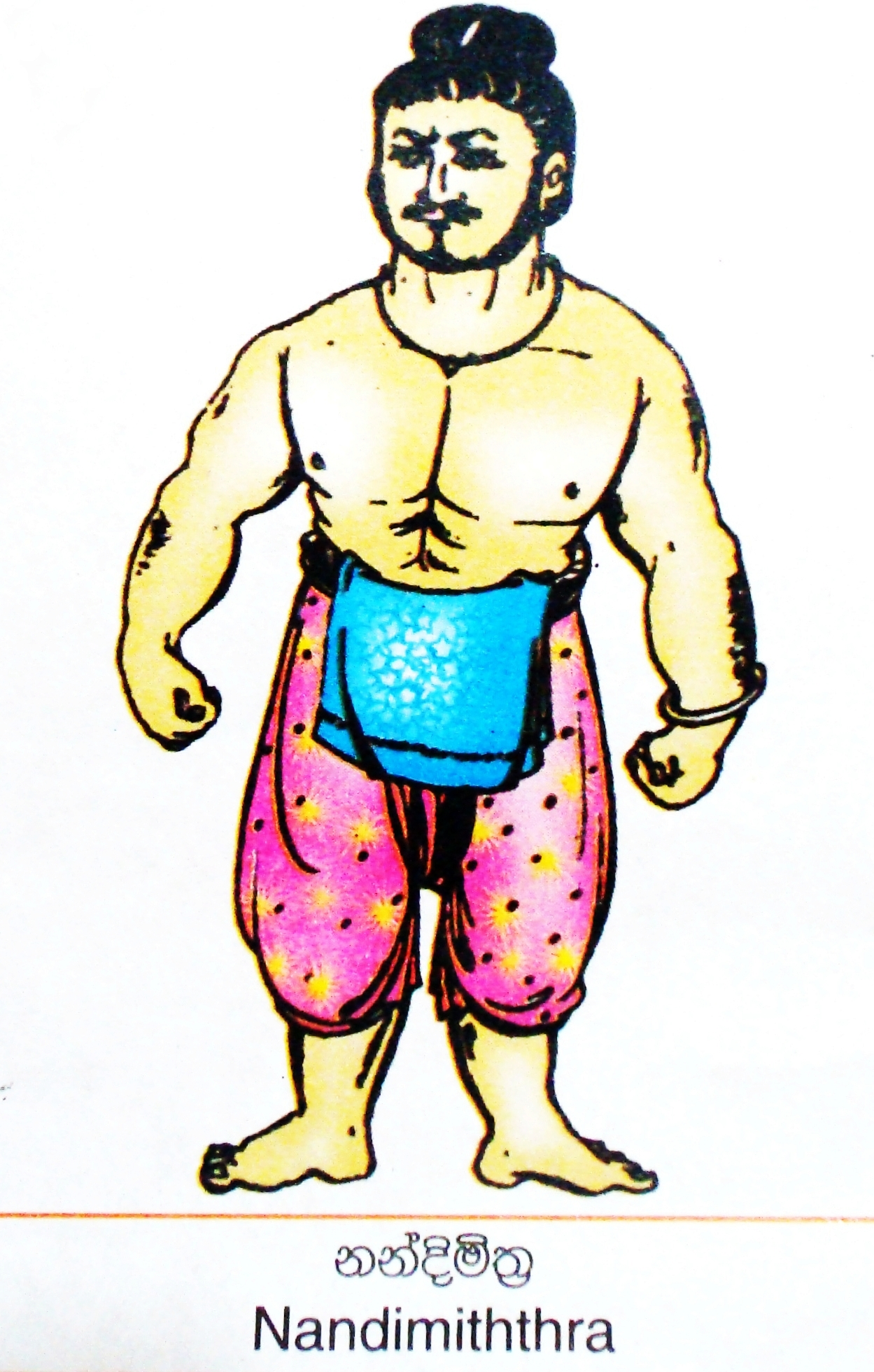

Nandhimitra (Sinhala: නන්දිමිත්‍ර) (also known as Nandhimitta) was the best known and the leader of the ten giant warriors. He was the nephew of Mitta, a well known strong great general in King Dutugemunu's army, and was named after him. It is said that he had the strength of ten elephants and that he was the most skilled mahout of the war elephants in King Dutugemunu's army. As a young child, Mitta's mother tied him to a millstone to stop him from wandering off, but his great strength enabled the young boy to drag the heavy stone behind him, thus earning the name Nandhimitra. Then his mother tied him to a larger mortar, but he was able to drag that one too and continue following his mother. Then his mother tied him to a large bamboo tree, but that he uprooted and again followed his mother.

Grown up, Nandimitra went to serve his uncle in king Dutugamunu's army, and is said to have killed soldiers who desecrated the temples and other holy sites by ripping them apart "treading one leg down with his foot while he grasped the other with his hand"(Mahãvamsa, chapter 23, verse 3)

The Mahãvamsa narrative suggests that Nandhimitra subsequently travelled to Rohana to serve a king who worshipped the noble triple gem (Mahãvamsa, chapter 23, verse 4-15) – a supposition that has been questioned by scholars, who argued that Elera himself, despite his Tamil heritage, had been a patron of the Buddhist temples (De Silva, 2005).

Nandhimitra once defeated the famous Kandula elephant with his bare hands, and the elephant held a grudge against him for it. During the battle in Wijithapura, the Kandula elephant was used to break into the fortress of Elara. As Kandula was ramming the fortress, a large iron door almost fell on his head, but Nandhimitra caught it in his hands, saving the elephant. From that day their rivalry ended.

== Suranimala ==
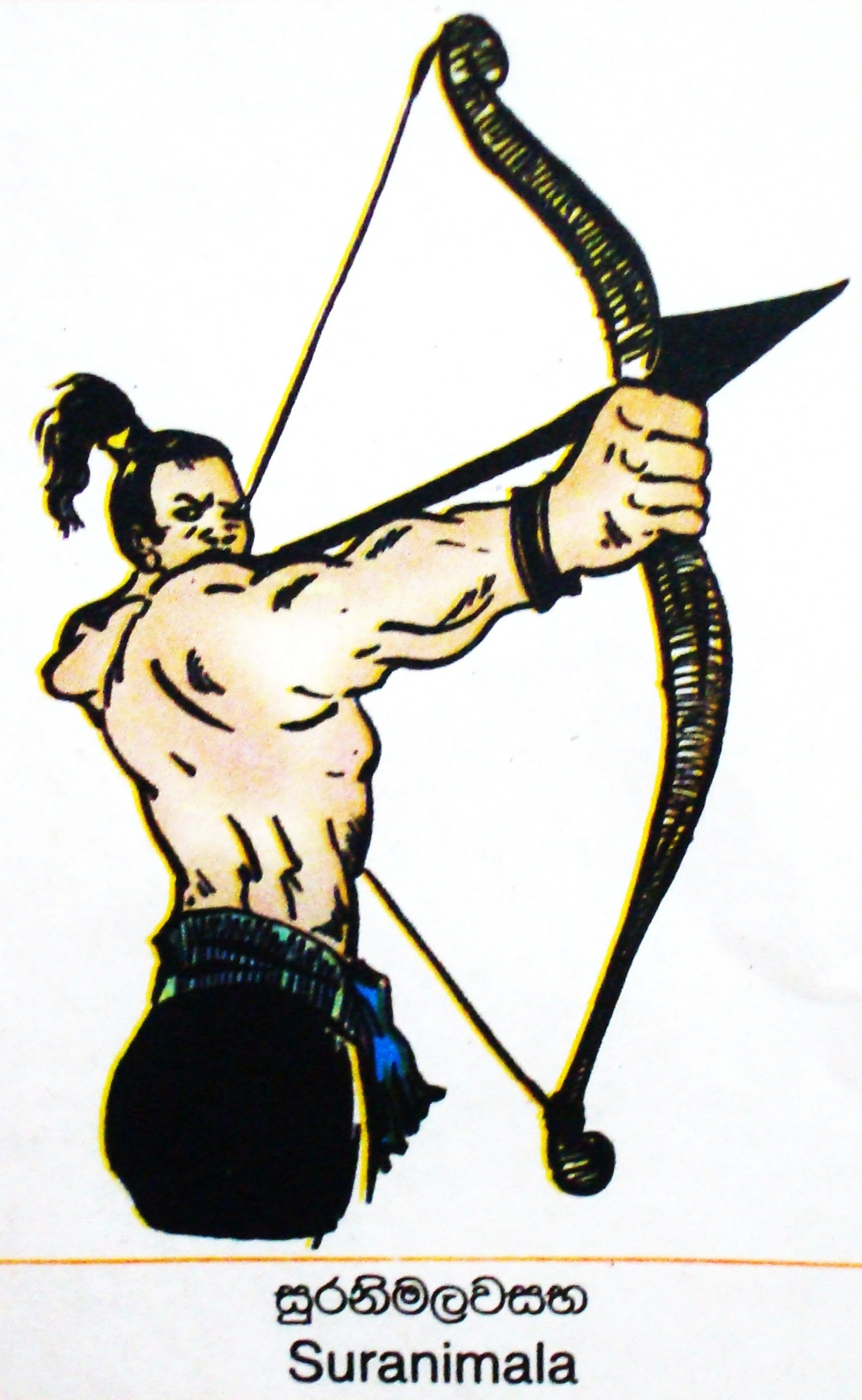

According to the Mahãvamsa (chapter 23, verse 16-44), Nimala was the seventh son of a village headman named Samgha, in the village of Khandakavitthika in the Kotthivala district. As a young man, Nimala was sent into the service of prince Dighabaya, King Kavavannatissa's son from a lesser queen. Dighabaya, who was in charge of Kacchakatittha, sent Nimala on an errand to a Brahman named Kundali, who lived near the Cetiya mountain in the Dvaramandala village. Nimala marched the great distance of more than eighteen yojanas form Kacchakatittha to Dvaramandala, then from there to Anuradhapura to bathe in the Tissa tank, and back to his master the prince at Kacchakatittha, fetching the precious punnavaddhana garments gifted by the Brahmin, in just one day. Nimala was thus named Sura-nimala (Sinhala: සුරනිමල).

== Veḷusumana ==
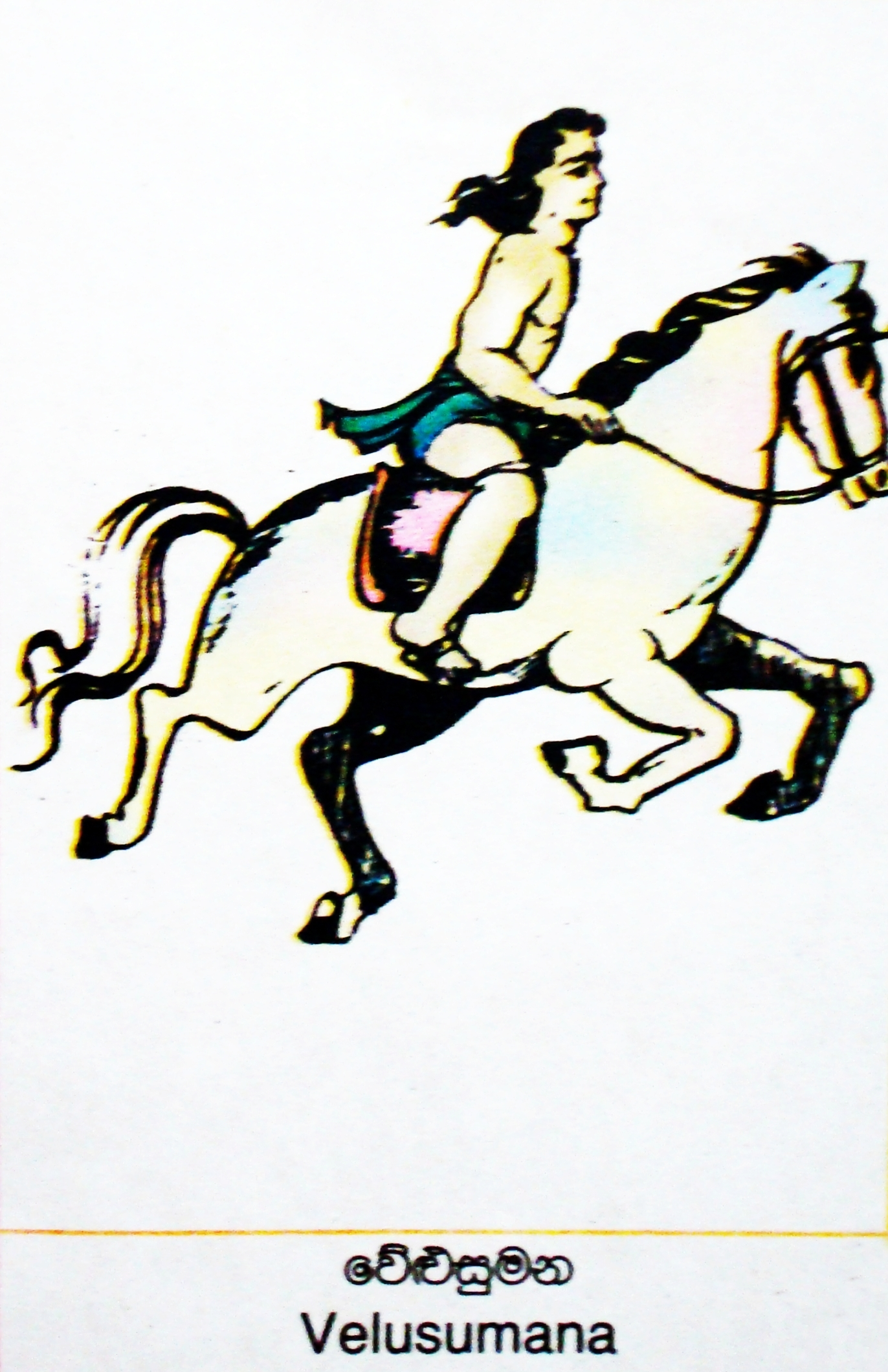

The warrior Veḷusumana (Sinhala: වේළුසුමන) was born the son of a householder named Vasabha, in the Kutumbiyangana in the Giri district, and was named after his friends Veḷa and Sumana, who was the governor of Giri. He was the most skilled mounted warrior in King Dutugemunu's army. Young Velusumanna was able to ride a Sindhu (Saindhava – form the Indus country) horse belonging to the governor, a beast that would not let any man ride him. Not only did he break the horse, he galloped in circles so fast that he made it appear a chain of riders (Mahãvamsa, chapter 23, verse 68-77).

Veḷusumana gave his service to King Kavantissa (King Dutugemunu's father) and then to King Dutugemunu. When Wihara Maha Devi (King Dutugemunu's mother) was expecting her child, she had a few desires. She wanted to make a garland with lotus flowers from the thisa wewa. She also wanted to drink the water that washed the sword which beheaded the security chief of King Elara.

King Kavantissa entrusted this mission to Veḷusumana. First he went to Anuradhapura and became friendly with the man in charge of the stable, where he selected the fastest horse. Then he rode to pick the lotus flowers from thisa wewa, before going to the main camp of King Elara. There Veḷusumana taunted all the guards by saying that he was a spy of the Sinhala king and challenging them to arrest him if they could. The security chief chased Veḷusumana on the next fastest horse. As Veḷusumana raced ahead, he stirred up the dust, impeding the security chief's vision. Then he stopped and went back a little, to wait with outstretched sword. The security chief could not see Veḷusumana's sword because of the dust, and his head was cut off at the neck after chasing so recklessly. Veḷusumana returned to the Sinhala King the same day with the lotus flowers, the head of the security chief and the two best horses of the enemy.

== Gotaimbara ==
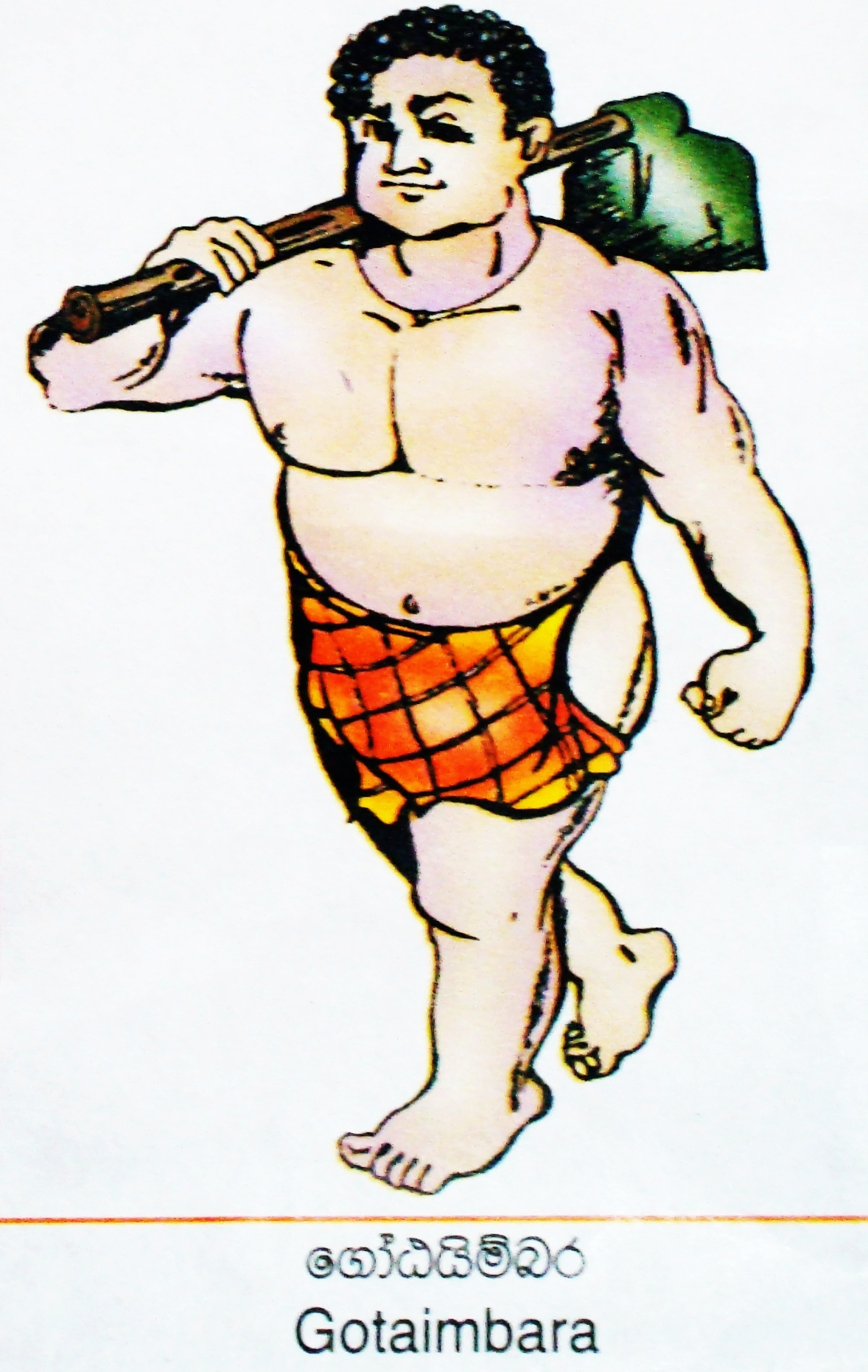

According to the Mahãvamsa (chapter 23, verse 49-54), Gotaimbara (Sinhala: ගෝඨයිම්බර), the seventh and youngest son of Mahanaga, was born in the village of Nitthulavitthika in the Giri region. Once, his brothers cleared the jungle for cultivation, but left a smaller area for Gota, who was short and lazy, to clear. Gota got angry with his brothers and cleared the whole jungle by uprooting some giant Imbara trees using his hands. Because of this incident, his family named him Gota of Imbara, which became Gotaimbara, and he was sent to the king of Lanka for royal service.

Dagonna has been an area of Gotaimbera, one of the ten giants (ministers) of King Dutugamunu. Thus it gains a reputation in the history of the country. Devanandaramaya and the adjoining Devalaya, which is devoted to Gotaimbera, is said to be one of the places where Gotaimbera used to live, attending to agricultural activities. When he joined King Dutugamunu's army, he made a vow that when King Dutugamunu won the war, he would build a Buddhist temple. Later, fulfilling his vow, he constructed the Devanandaramaya temple, which means satisfaction of gods. According to folklore, Gotaimbera's native village is Godigamuwa, in the western province of Sri Lanka, at Divulapitiya electorate. But he lived in Dagonna, his mother's and wife's (Aepaa Devi's) native place.

According to the Sūkara Pōtikā Kathā Vastuva, Lakuṇṭhaka Atimbaru (Gotaibara) married Sumanā, who later became an Arahant Therī. Following the defeat of Elara, Gotaibara engaged in a duel with Riṭigala Jayasēna, provoked by an inappropriate act committed by Jayasēna towards Gotaibara’s wife Sōnā—identified either as Sumanā herself or as a second wife. The duel resulted in Jayasēna’s death. This victory led to resentment against Gotaimbara within the political and military establishment. Consequently, he left the country and traveled to the Himalayas, where he himself attained arahantship.

An inscription at Situlpavva mentions a cave associated with the chieftain Ayimara—believed to be Gotaibara—and his wife, the chieftainess Soṇā.

== Theraputthabhaya ==
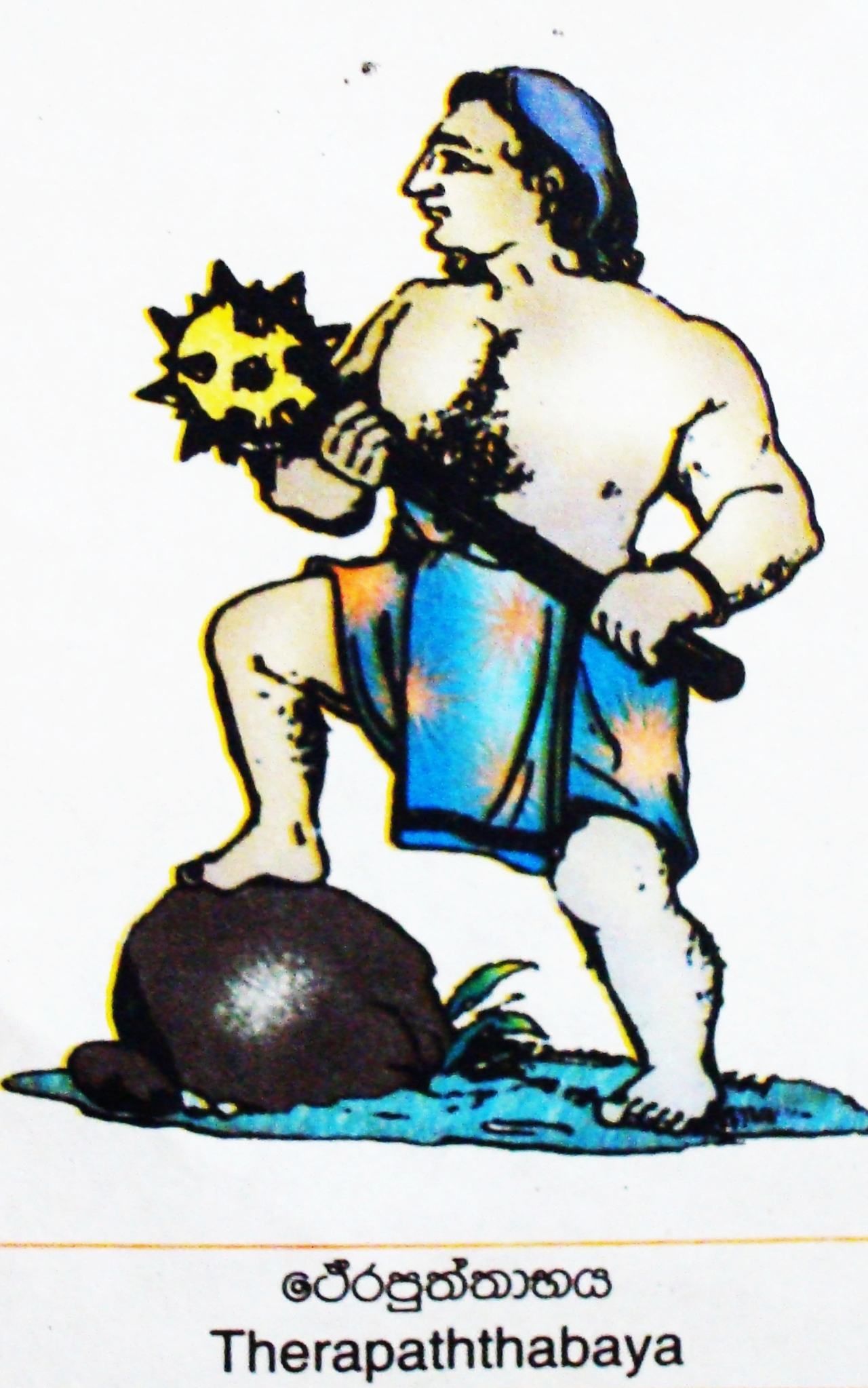

Theraputthabhaya (Sinhala: ථෙරපුත්තාභය) who is regarded the strongest of all the ten giants was born the son of a householder named Rohana, the headman of the village Kitti near the Kota mountain. A prolific stone lifter, when he was ten or twelve, Theraputthabhaya could throw rocks that could only be lifted by four or five grown men. His father Rohana was a supporter of the thera (buddhist monk) Mahasumma, and on hearing a discourse of the thera at the pabbata-vihara, attained the first stage of enlightenment, sothapanna. Rohana was subsequently ordained as a monk, and in time an arahath. Theraputthabhaya thus became known as Thera-putt-abhya, abalya the son (putta) of the thera. (Mahãvamsa, chapter 23, verse 55-63)

The ministers of the king, on a search for strong, brave men, came to take a rest at the temple where Theraputthabhaya was staying as a monk. One of the men they had collected had shaken a coconut tree until all the coconuts fell down. As punishment for this mischievous and wasteful act, Theraputthabhaya dragged the man along the road by his big toe. When the king asked him for his service for the country, he again became a layman in order to do so. After winning the battle against King Elara, Theraputthabhaya again became a monk.

== Maha Sona ==
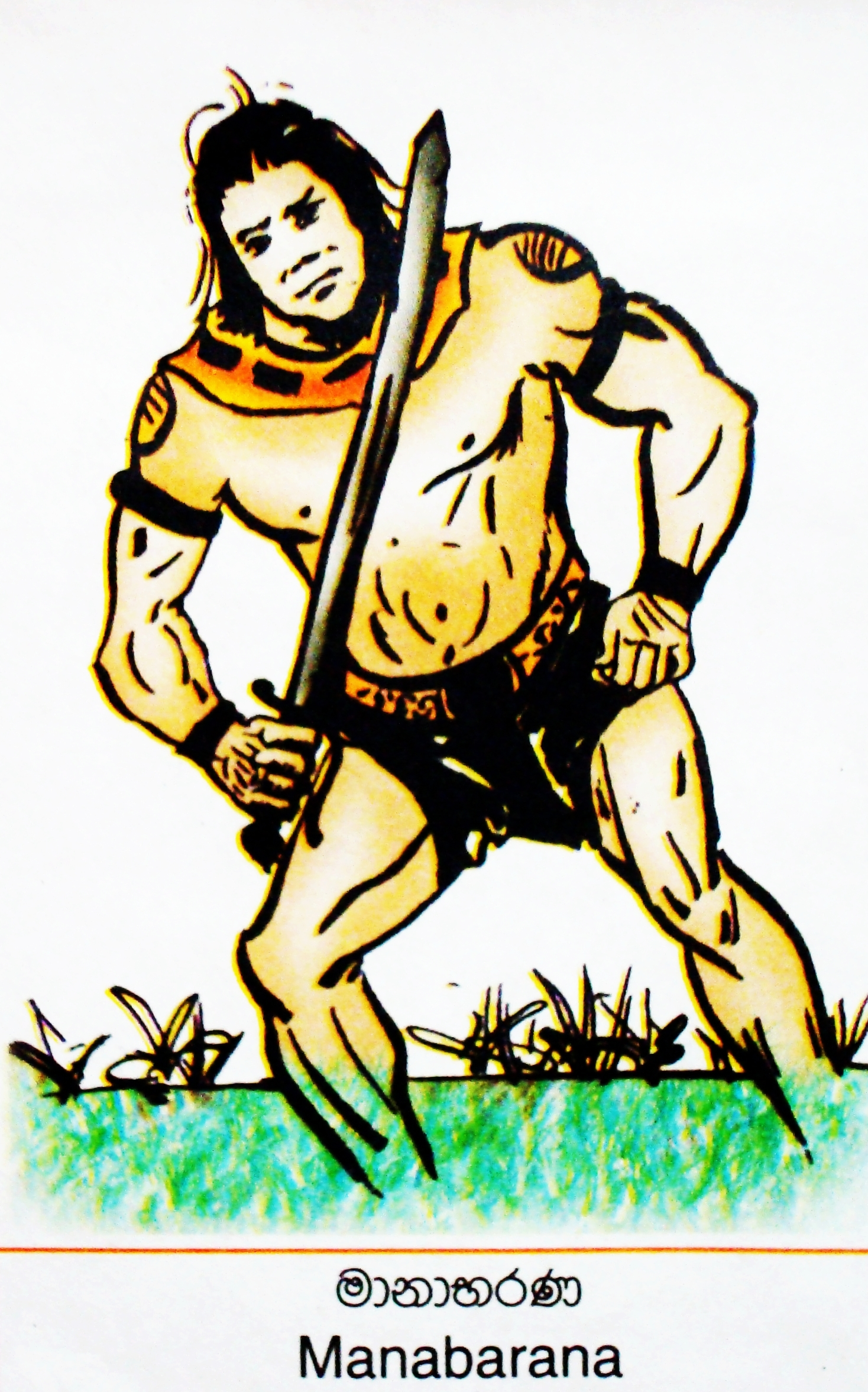

In the village of Hundrivapi, a man named Tissa had eight sons. The youngest was named Sena. At the age of seven he could break young palms with his bare hands and at the age of ten he could uproot palm trees. News of his strength reached King Kavantissa, who decided to recruit him into the army of his son, Prince Gemunu. He was renamed as Maha Sona (Sinhala: මහාසෝණ) after his death because of his last fight at a cemetery (Sohona).

== Maha Bharana ==
According to the Mahãvamsa (chapter 23, verse 64-67), Bharana was born in the village of Kappakandara to a man named Kumara. As a young boy of ten or twelve, Bharana was said to be able to chase after hares in the forest and crush them under his feet. At sixteen he was said to outrun and hunt antelope, elk and boar, thus becoming recognized as a great warrior and subsequently named Maha Bharana (Sinhala: මහාභරණ) which translates in to 'great Bharana'.

== Khanchadeva ==
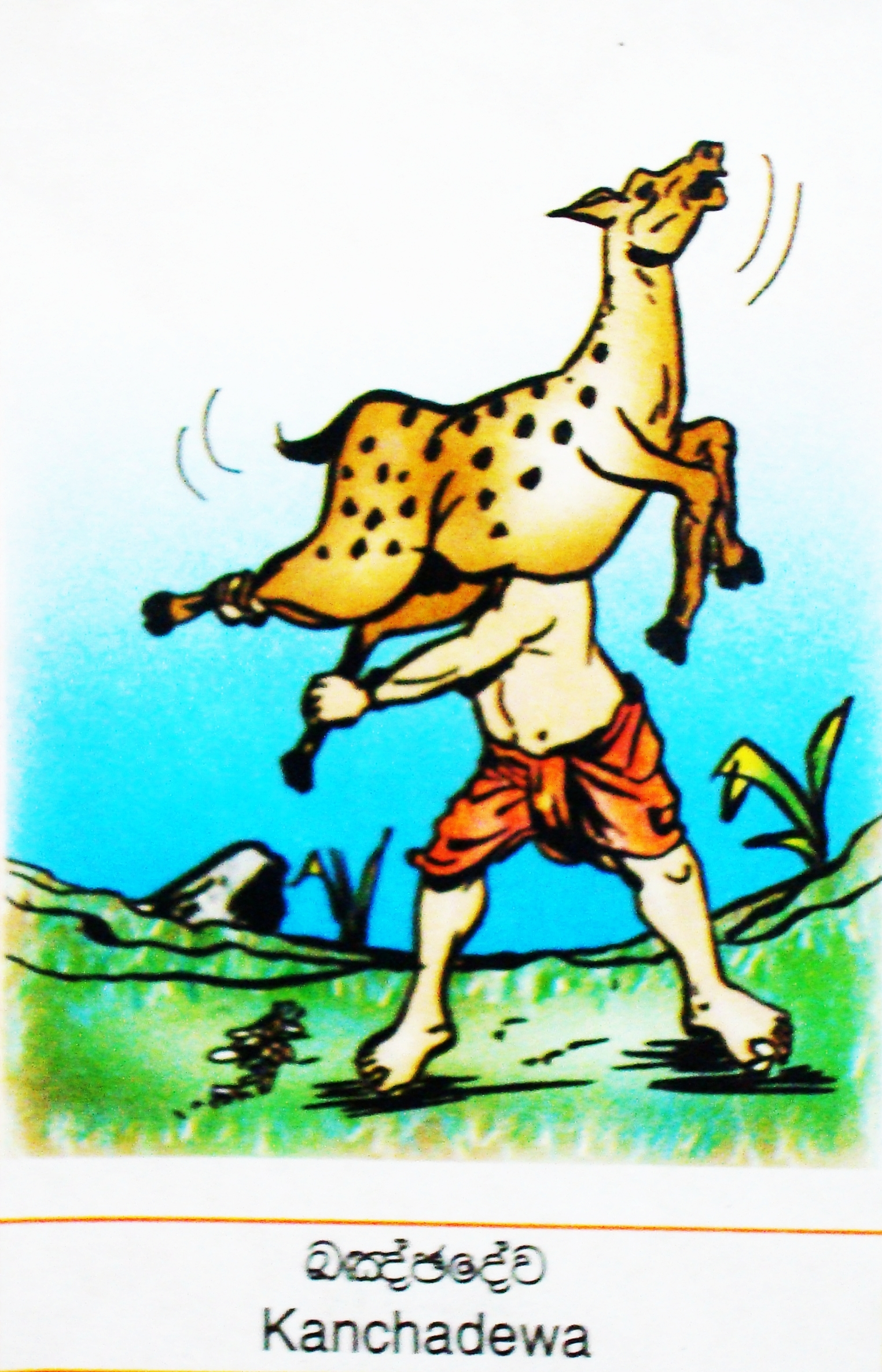

According to the Mahãvamsa (chapter 23, verse 78-81), he was born Dewa (people), the youngest son of Abhaya of the Mahisadonika village in the Nakulanaga district. He was later dubbed Khanchadeva (Sinhala: ඛංචදේව) as he limped a little. The young man was able to chase great buffaloes, grasp them by their legs, whirl them over his head and dash them to the ground.

== Phussadeva ==
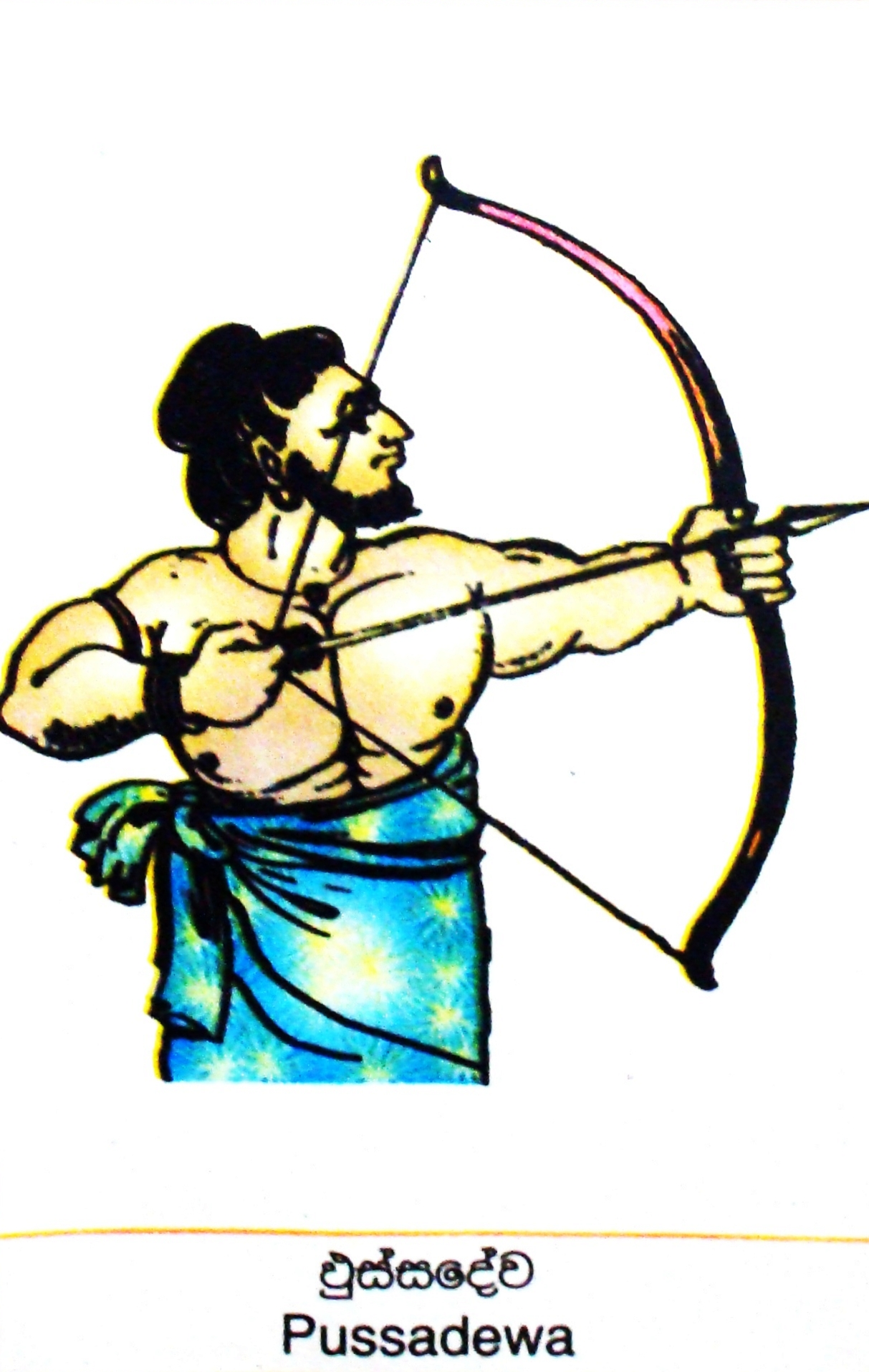

According to the Mahãvamsa (chapter 23, verse 82-89) Phussadeva (Sinhala: ඵුස්සදේව) was born the son of Uppala from Dewa (people) in a village named Gavita near the Cittalapabbata temple. As a young boy visiting the temple Phussadeva is said to have been able to blow conch shells so loudly that they sounded like thunder, thus being named Ummadaphussadeva. Phussadeva became a renowned archer who never missed his mark. He was described as being an extraordinarily expert archer, who shot, by "flash of lightning", or through a horse -hair, or a cart filled with sand, as well as through hides a hundred-fold thick, through an Asoka plank eight inches, an Udumbara plank sixteen inches thick, a plate of iron as well as four inches thick plate of brass. And his arrow would fly the distance of eight usabhas and through water one usabha (Mahãvamsa, pg. 92). An usabha is 149 cubits or about 204 feet ("SINHALA BOWS", Henry Parker)

== Labhiyavasabha ==
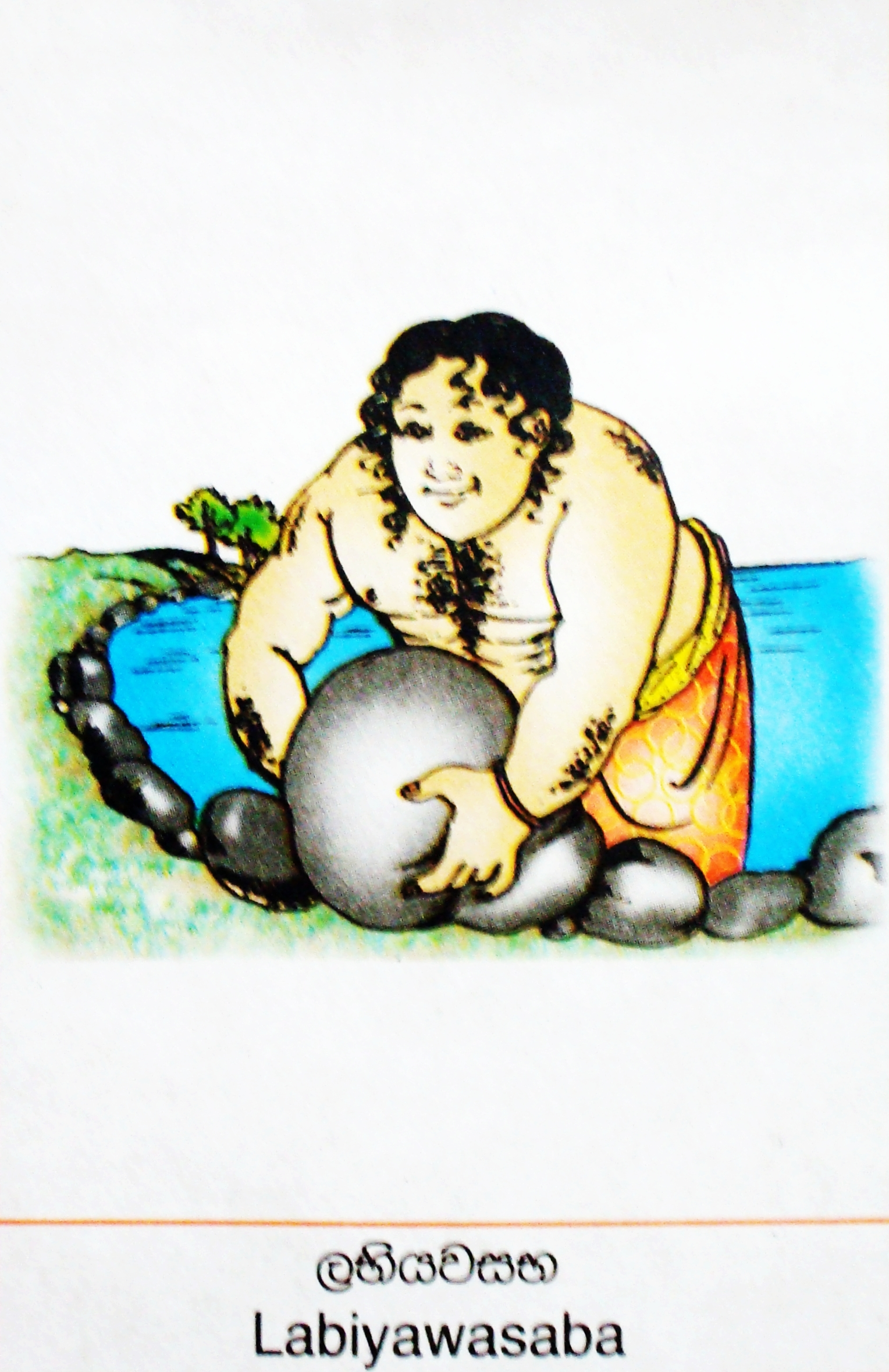

Vasabha was born, the son of the house holder Matta, in the village of Viharavapi, near the Tuladhara mountain, and was named Labhiyavasabha (Sinhala: ලභියවසභ) which translates into 'vasabha the gifted', on account of his noble physique. At the age of twenty it is said Vasabha had single-handedly moved such masses of earth that could only be moved by a dozen men to build the Vasabha tank with relative ease (Mahãvamsa, chapter 23, verse 90-95).
