= Kelani Tissa =

King of Kelaniya of Sri Lanka

- King of Kelaniya
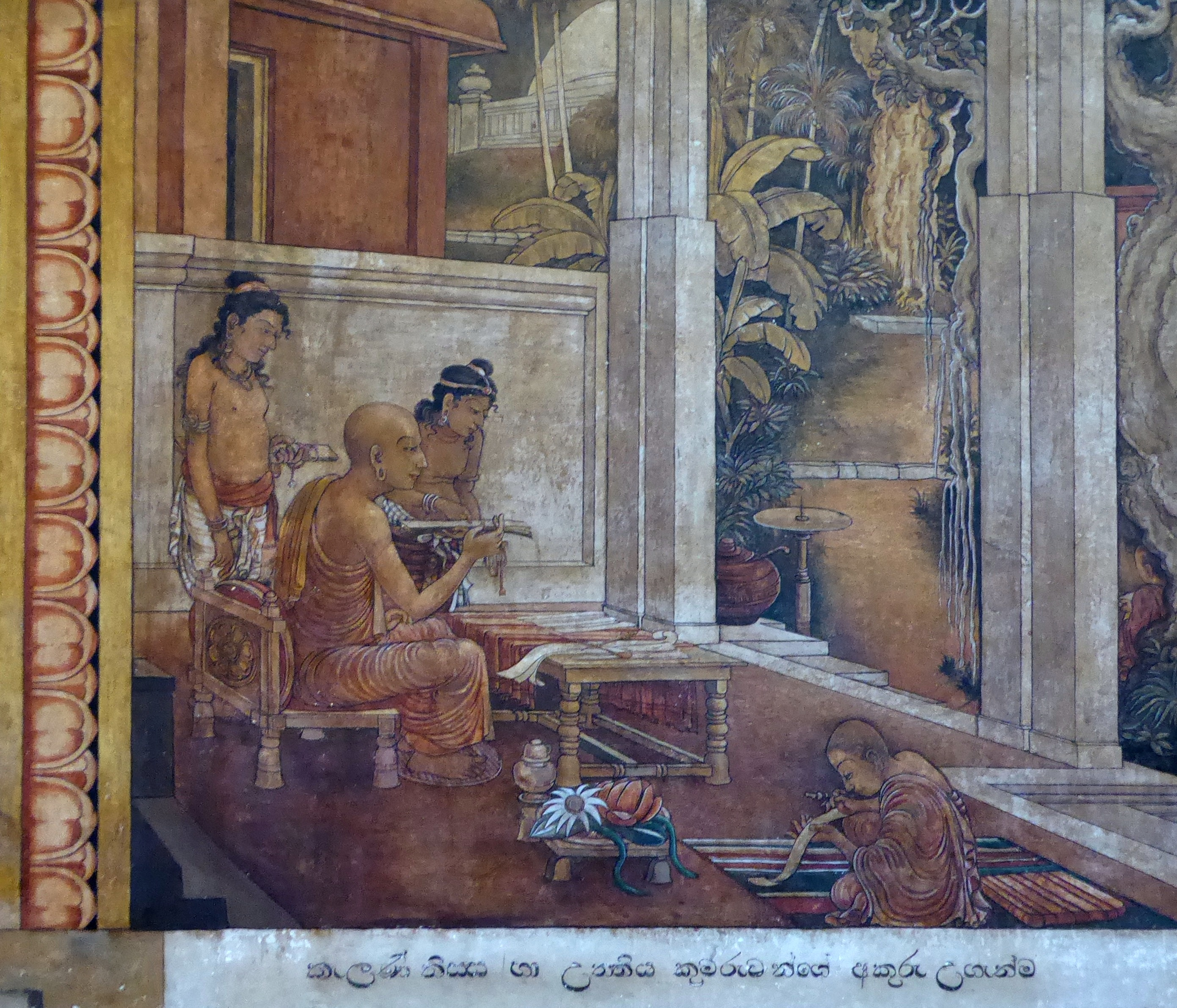
- Kelani Tissa and Uttiya learning Letters in the Temple
- Predecessor: King Dhamaraja of Kelaniya
- Issue: Viharamahadevi
- Dynasty: Naga Clan
- Father: King Dhamaraja
- Mother: Queen Uttara Devi
- Religion: Theravāda Buddhism

King Kelani Tissa was a king who ruled Kelaniya (also known as Maya Rata) of Sri Lanka. He was the eldest son of King Dhamaraja and Queen Uttara Devi of Kelaniya. His brother was Uttiya. His daughter was Viharamahadevi. According to legend, he punished an innocent monk so the gods became angry and made the ocean come inland causing a flood. To stop the flood he had to sacrifice his daughter to the ocean. He punished the monk due to his brother Uttiya.

The King's Buddhism teacher was an Arahant, so the Arahant and his disciples were given the morning meal daily.

King Kelani Tissa's brother, Uttiya, was not a very disciplined person. Uttiya had an interest in the queen. So he made advances to start an affair. Gradually, the King came to know about this, so Uttiya fled to Ruhunu and had to live in hiding.

Uttiya had mastered the handwriting of an Arahant, and wrote a letter to the queen, his brother's wife, emulating the handwriting of an Arahant. He dressed a person as a bhikku, to join the Arahant and his disciples at the palace morning meal, in order to deliver the letter to the queen safely. The person was able to drop the letter near the queen, however the King came and picked it up.

The King was furious, and misled by his brother's plot, he deemed that the Arahant was responsible as it was written in an Arahant's handwriting. The King immediately ordered the Arahant to be put into a cauldron of boiling oil for a slow and painful death, and the person disguised as a bhikku to be immediately killed. His orders were carried out and the Arahant was killed in front of all monks and laymen. The dying Arahant didn't bear any ill will for the King, however he died after delivering one hundred sermons to the crowd assembled. Their bodies were dropped to the ocean.

Legends say that the ocean started coming inland and covered up to nearly 28 miles inside the kingdom, as in a tsunami. Legend states that this happened because the gods and deities in heaven were angry at the King for killing the innocent Arahant. A proposal was put out that the King's daughter, Viharamahadevi, should be sacrificed in order to save the remaining part of the kingdom. She willingly sacrificed herself in order to save her motherland. A vessel, with the inscription that the maiden in it was King Kelani Tissa's daughter, was prepared and launched into the sea.
