= Kaduruwela =

Kaduruwela கதுருவெல කදුරුවෙල
- Town
- Location in Sri Lanka
- Coordinates: 7°56′N 81°0′E
- Country: Sri Lanka
- Province: North Central Province
- Administrative District: Polonnaruwa District
- Time zone: UTC+05:30 (SLST)

Kaduruwela (Tamil: கதுருவெல; Sinhala: කදුරුවෙල) is a town located in Polonnaruwa District of North Central Province of Sri Lanka. The area is predominantly populated by Muslims. Kaduruwela is known for its agriculture based economy.

== History ==
Some historians and archaeologists believe that Vijithapura is located close to Kaduruwela, where the ruins of an ancient fortress have been found.

== Religious places ==
The Kaduruwela Jumma Muslim Mosque is located in Kaduruwela.

== Schools ==
Kaduruwela Muslim Central College is one of the schools located in Kaduruwela, Polonnaruwa District. Kaduruwela Muslim Central College was designated as a national school at a ceremony held in 2019 under the patronage of North Central Province Governor Sarath Ekanayake.

In 2015, Sri Lankan President Maithripala Sirisena announced plans to establish a multi-ethnic, trilingual school in Kaduruwela targeting Sinhala, Tamil, and Muslim students, and the construction works began with the assistance of the Government of India for a grant of Rs. 300 million. The Memorandum of understanding was signed India's High Commissioner to Sri Lanka Taranjit Singh Sandhu and Secretary to the Ministry of Education Sunil Hettiarachchi for the construction of multi-ethnic cultural school in Kaduruwela.

== Irrigation ==
In November 2019, Sri Lankan President Maithripala Sirisena opened the water pump station and the tower in Kaduruwela to provide clean drinking water to the residents living in the Kaduruwela area. The water pump station and tower in Kaduruwela were declared open as part of the ‘Pibidemu Polonnaruwa’ district development program.

== Banks and finance companies ==
In 2007, Amãna Takaful opened its branch in Kaduruwela and the Amãna Takaful Kaduruwela branch initially operated as a development office. The Amãna Takaful was relocated to a new location at No. 379A, Main Street, Kaduruwela, Polonnaruwa. The 52nd branch of Pan Asia Bank network was opened in Kaduruwela in July 2011. On 27 March 2013, Amana Bank opened its first branch in Kaduruwela.

In 2015, Vallibel Finance opened its branch in Kaduruwela. On 28 December 2017, Cargills Bank opened its first branch in Kaduruwela. The Kaduruwela branch of Cargills Bank was unveiled in order to work in collaboration with the agriculture farmers in Kaduruwela. In December 2020, NDB Bank relocated its initial Kaduruwela branch location to Batticaloa Road, Polonnaruwa.
