= Gothabhaya, Prince of Ruhuna =

Gothabhaya
- Ruler of Ruhuna
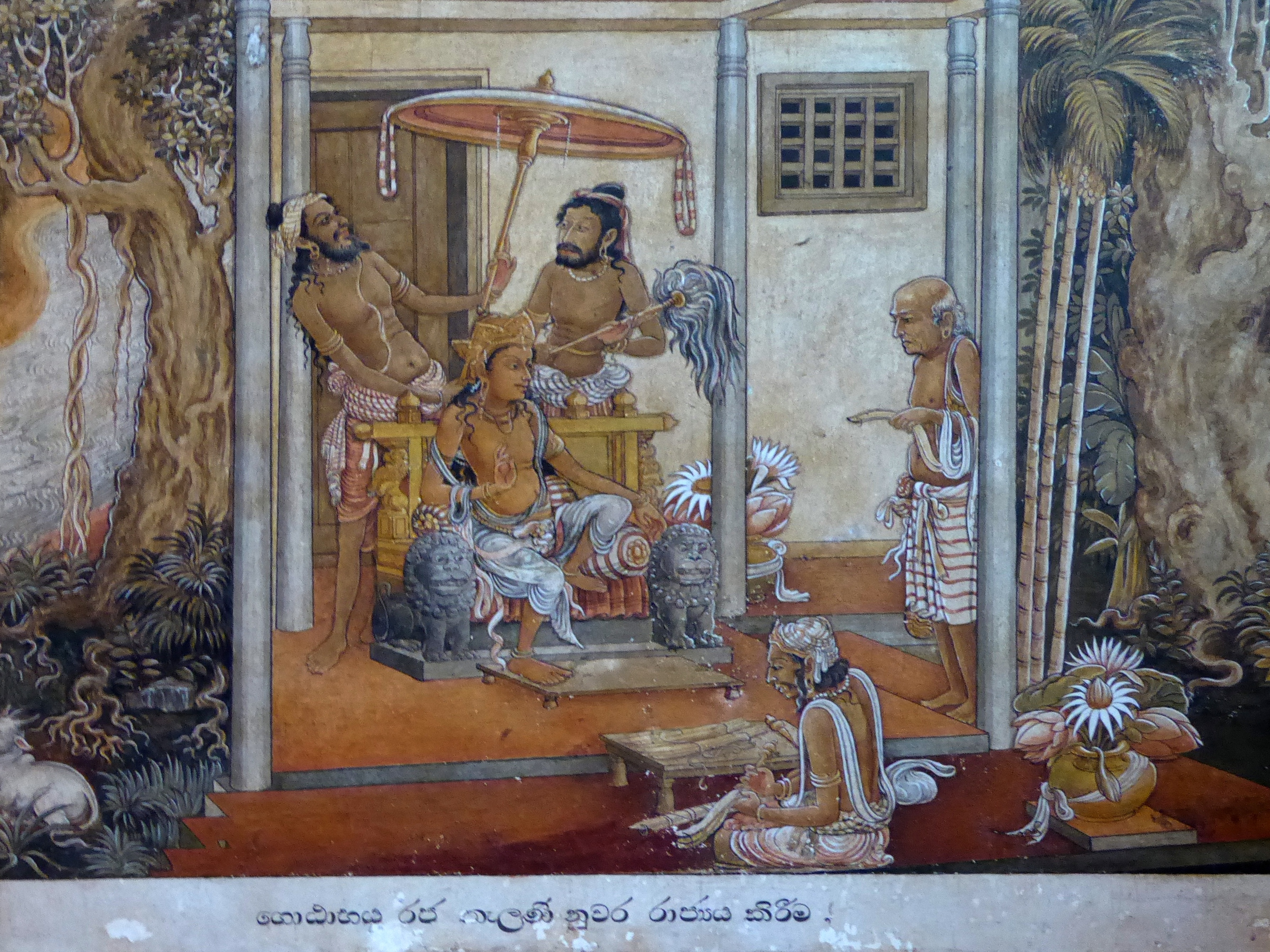
- Gothabhaya establishes Kelani Town
- Reign: unknown
- Predecessor: Yatala Tissa
- Successor: Kavan Tissa
- Issue: Kavan Tissa Queen Consort Somawathi of Somapura
- House: House of Vijaya
- Dynasty: Shakya
- Father: Yatala Tissa
- Religion: Theravāda Buddhism

Gothabhaya, was an early monarch of Sri Lanka of the Kingdom of Ruhuna in the Southern region of the island. The Kingdom of Ruhuna was a Sub kingdom loyal to the King of Anuradhapura

== See also ==
- List of monarchs of Sri Lanka

Gothabhaya, Prince of Ruhuna Born: c.250 BC Died: c. 205 BC
Regnal titles
Preceded by Yatala Tissa	Count of Ruhuna ? BC–? BC	Succeeded by Kavan Tissa
