= Vijithapura =

Vijithapura විජිතපුර விஜித நகரம்
- Town
- Location within Sri Lanka
- Country: Sri Lanka
- Province: North Central Province
- District: Anuradhapura District
- Time zone: UTC+5:30 (Sri Lanka Standard Time)
- Sri Lanka Post: 50110
- Area code: 024

Vijithapura (Sinhala: විජිතපුර, romanized: Vijitapura; Tamil: விஜித நகரம், romanized: Vijita Nakaram), also known as Vijitha Nagara or Vijithagama, was a fortress–city in ancient Sri Lanka. When Vijaya, the first recorded ruler of the country arrived from India, he brought a large retinue of his followers with him. These followers spread throughout the country, and established settlements. One of his chief followers named Vijitha founded the establishment which was then known as Vijitha Nagara (city of Vijitha) or Vijithagama (village of Vijitha). The city is believed to have been founded during the reign of king Panduvasudeva, the third recorded king of Sri Lanka, who was the brother in law of the chieftain Vijitha.

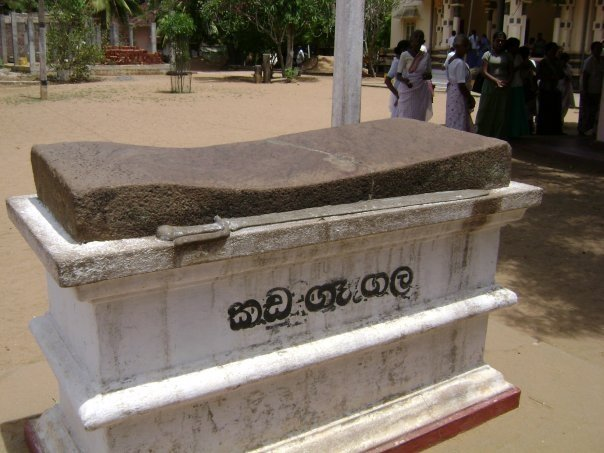
The stone which may have been used by Dutthagamani's soldiers to sharpen their swords

The city is mentioned again in the chronicles Mahavamsa, Dipavamsa, Rajavaliya and Thupavamsa nearly 300 years later during the reign of king Dutthagamani. The city is then a highly fortified stronghold of Ellalan, against whom Dutthagamani had launched a military campaign. The Thupavamsa mentions that it was defended by three moats and a high wall. The wall had four gates made of wrought iron on the north, south, east and west. The Rajavaliya describes Vijithapura as a fortress second only to the then capital city of Anuradhapura. Dutthagamani's army laid siege on the city for four months before finally capturing it through simultaneous attacks on all four gates.

After this, there is no more mention of Vijithapura in the ancient chronicles. However, historians believe that the city may have been an important trade center during the early stages of the Anuradhapura Kingdom, connecting several trade routes. The exact location of the city is uncertain. However, a modern village with the same name exists near the ancient Kalawewa reservoir, which may be the location of ancient Vijithapura. There is an ancient temple here as well as a granite stone that locals believe to have been used by Dutthagamani's soldiers to sharpen their swords before their battle. Other historians and archaeologists believe that the location is close to Kaduruwela near Polonnaruwa, where the ruins of an ancient fortress have been found.
