= Thūpavaṃsa =

- OpenTipitaka
- Type: Chronicle
- Composition: 13th century
- Attribution: Vācissara

The Thūpavaṃsa ("Chronicle of the Stupa") is a Sri Lankan historical chronicle and religious text recorded in the Pali language. Its composition is attributed to a Buddhist monk known as Vācissara, the putative author of several Pali and Sinhala commentaries and handbooks. It was likely composed in the second half of the 13th Century.

== Origins ==
The Thupavamsa overlaps significantly with the Mahabodhivamsa, and portions of it are included in the extended (or Kambodian) Mahavamsa. Material for the Thupavamsa seems to have been borrowed from the Mahavamsa, Jataka-Nidana-katha, Samantapasadika, and the Mahavamsa commentary.

The colophon of the Pali version identifies its author, Vācissara, listing several Sinhala compositions attributed to him and describing him as a relative or dependent of King Parakrama. Vācissara seems to be the same individual who was a senior Sangha leader under Vijaya-Bahu III, and whose name is included in a listing of learned monks and laymen in the Raja-ratnakara. Vācissara identifies two works that he relied on in composing the Thupavamsa, an unknown Sinhala chronicle and an older Pali text identified with the lost Cetiya-vamsattha-kathathat by scholars.

Two versions of the Thupavamsa are preserved, one in Pali and one in Sinhala. The Sinhala version seems to be an expansion of the Pali chronicle, but the situation is complicated by the fact that both existent versions seem to have relied on earlier, Sinhala language sources in addition to the Mahavamsa and its commentary. Some 19th Century scholars suggested that the Sinhala Thupavamsa was actually the earlier work and the Sinhala source of the Pali version, but this possibility is now discounted by scholars. The Sinhala version identifies its author as Sakala Kala Widya Chakrawarthi Parakrama Pandita, whose name appears in a list of 'learned laymen' composed in the 13th Century.

== Contents ==
The Thupavamsa follows the structure of the Mahavamsa and other Pali chronicles- it begins with the story of past Buddhas, describes the life of Buddha Shakyamuni, Ashoka's missions, and the arrival of various Buddha relics and a sapling of the Bodhi tree in Sri Lanka. It was composed in Sanskritized Pali typical of the era in Sri Lanka.

The second half of the book is devoted to describing the reign of King Dutugamunu, focusing on his construction of the Mahathupa ('Great Stupa') at Anuradhapura. The relics enshrined in the stupa are traced back to the division of relics recorded in the Mahaparinibbana Sutta.

== Publication ==
- The Chronicle of the Thupa and the Thupavamsa, Being a Translation and Edition of Vacissaratthera's Thupavamsa. N.A. Jayawickrama, London 1971.
- Thupavamsa, translated into Bengali by Sadhankamal Chowdhury, Karuna Prakashani, Kolkata, 2005
