= Dutugamunu the Great =

Dutugamunu දුට්ඨ ගාමිණී අභය දුටුගැමුණු
- Maharaja ^{A} ^{B} Devanapiya
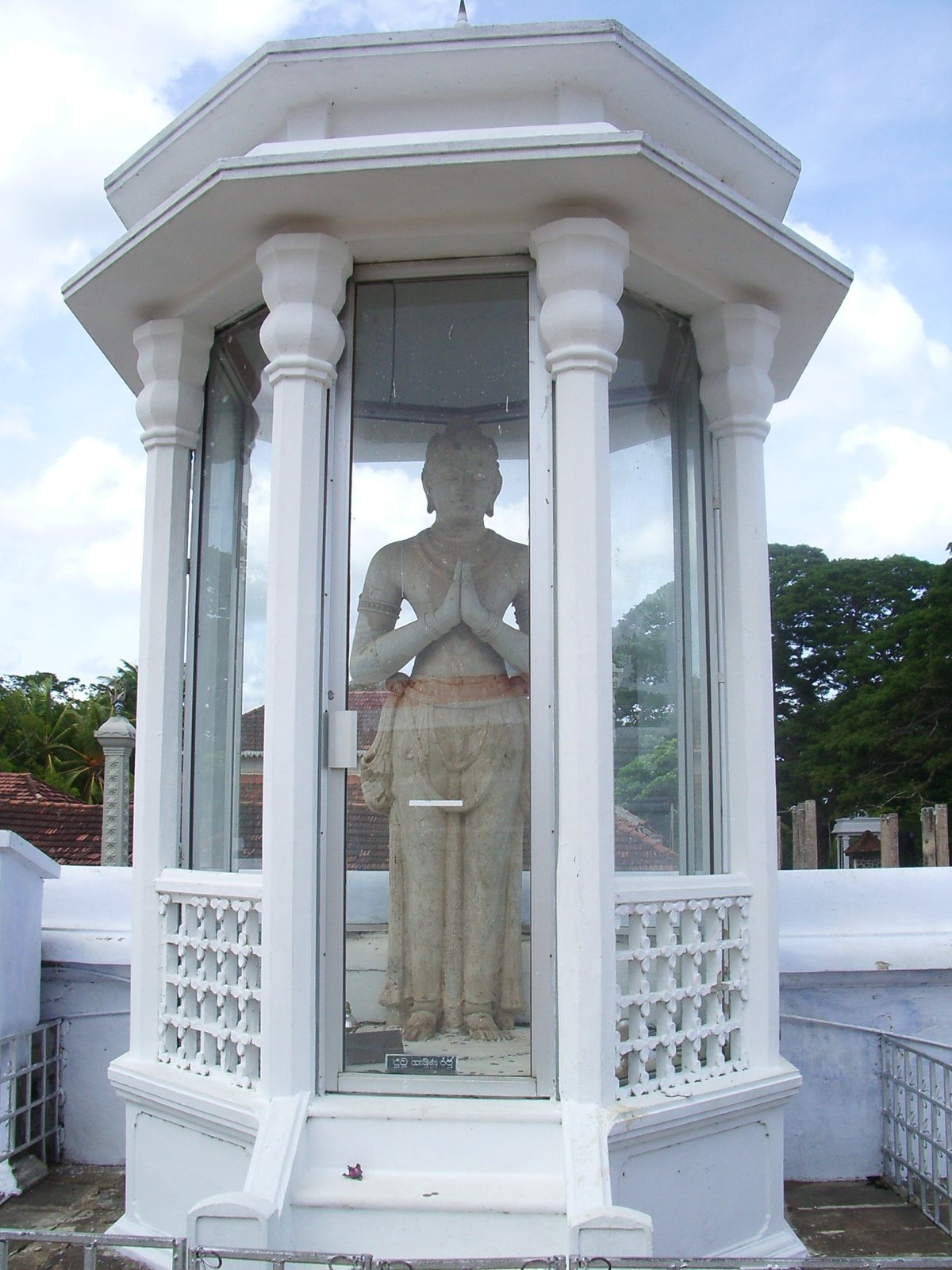
- Statue of King Dutugamunu beside Ruwanwelisaya Stupa

King of Anuradhapura
- Reign: 161 BC – 137 BC
- Coronation: 161 BC
- Predecessor: Elara the Pious
- Successor: Saddha Tissa
- Born: Tissamaharama, Hambanthota
- Died: 137 BC; Anuradhapura
- Spouse: Queen Consort; Kathi Queen Consort; Rajitha Royal Concubine; Kathika, ruler of Katiyawa division Royal Concubine; Shardha(Krishna)
- Issue: Prince Saliya Princess Abhihitha Prince Ayesiva
Names
- Gamini Abhaya
- House: House of Vijaya
- Dynasty: House of Vijaya
- Father: Kavan Tissa
- Mother: Viharamahadevi
- Religion: Theravāda Buddhism

Dutugamunu (Sinhala: දුටුගැමුණු, lit. 'Duṭugæmuṇu', [duʈugæmuɳu]), also known as Duṭṭhagāmaṇī Abhaya, was a king of the Anuradhapura Kingdom who reigned from 161 BC to 137 BC. He is renowned for first uniting the whole island of Sri Lanka by defeating and overthrowing Elara, a Tamil king from the Chola Kingdom, who had invaded the Anuradhapura kingdom in 205 BC. Dutugamunu also expanded and beautified the city of Anuradhapura and projected the power of the Rajarata kingdom across the island of Sri Lanka.

Due to his significance as one of the most potent symbols of Sinhalese historical power, Dutugamunu's story is swathed in myth and legend. However, many aspects of the accounts of his life have been verified by contemporary inscriptions, and the basic account of his life is generally accepted as accurate.

== Etymology ==
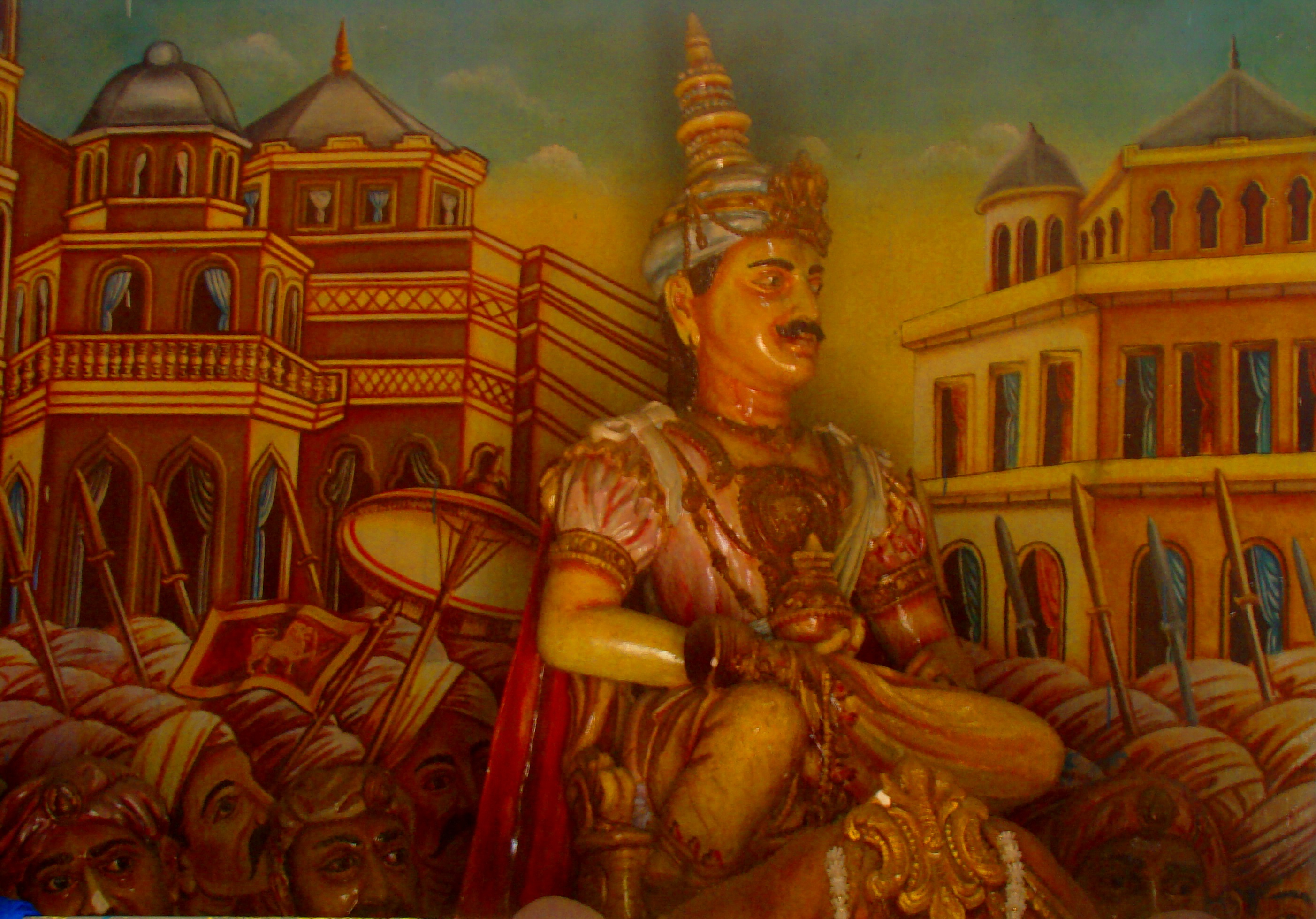
KING DUTUGEMUNU (161 BC – 137 BC)

Dutugamunu (Sinhala: දුටුගැමුණු, lit. 'Duṭugæmuṇu', Tamil: துட்டகாமினி, lit. 'Tuṭṭakāmiṉi') is also known in Pali as Duṭṭhagāmaṇī Abhaya. The Mahavamsa recounts that, as a youth, Dutugemunu mocked his father, King Kavantissa of Ruhuna, for refusing to wage war against King Elara the Pious, who had ruled Sri Lanka for 45 years and was revered by the Sinhalese as a just ruler, known as Dharmishta Elara. Elara governed the island, then called Ratnadipa, from Anuradhapura. Dutugemunu—whose prefix Dutta means 'terror-inspiring,' 'rustic,' or 'rowdy'—is said to have taunted his father, declaring, "If he were a man, he would not speak thus," and even sent him a piece of women’s jewelry. Enraged, King Kavantissa’s fury drove many of Dutugemunu’s friends to flee to the Malaya region, while the prince himself was branded 'Dutthagamani,' meaning 'the disobedient one. After his death, he was referred to as Dharma Gamini ("righteous Gamini"), but it is as Dutta Gamini or Dutugemunu that he is known to posterity.

== Ancestry and family ==
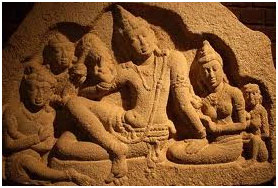
The "Royal Family" carving at Isurumuniya, traditionally said to depict Dutugemunu's family

The Mahavamsa constitutes the major source of Dutugemunu's reign and dedicates some six chapters (out of 35) to his tale. In chapter 22 he is described as being descended from the ancient royal family of Rajarata through Devanampiyatissa's brother Mahanaga. At the time of his birth, Dutugemunu's father was Kavantissa, king of Ruhuna, a small kingdom in south-east Sri Lanka outside of the influence of Rajarata in the north; the border between the two polities was the Mahaganga, or 'Great River', possibly the modern Menik Ganga. Kavantissa is portrayed in the Mahavamsa as 'devoutly believing in the three gems, [and] he provided the brotherhood continually with...needful things'.

Dutugemunu's mother was Viharamahadevi, daughter of Tissa, king of Kalyani. Legend has it that as punishment for Tissa slaying a Buddhist monk, Kalyani had been subject to a series of deluges from the sea. To placate it Tissa placed his daughter Devi in a golden boat with the words 'A King's Daughter' written on the side and set her out to sea. Miraculously the princess washed ashore, alive and well, in Ruhuna, and married Kavantissa.

During her pregnancy with Dutugemunu, Viharamahadevi had a series of peculiar cravings, including the urge to sleep on a pillow made of honeycombs. In particular, her urge to drink the water used to wash a sword that had cleaved the head of a warrior of Elara, whilst standing on that same head, raised the interest of the soothsayers at court, who predicted that 'The queen's son, when he has vanquished the Damilas (Tamil) and built up a united kingdom, will make the doctrine to shine forth brightly'. Viharamahadevi gave birth to a son named Gamani Abhaya sometime later, and after that to another child, a boy named Tissa.

Around the time of Gamani's birth, 'an elephant of the six-tusked race brought his young one thither and left him here and went his way'. Named Kandula, he went on to become Gamani's mount and accompanied him through much of the prince's adventures.

Recent archeological studies have found evidence proving that King Kavantissa had a daughter who was a sister to King Dutugamunu. New evidence to this appeared in The Island of March 27, 2017.

== The battle in the palace and early reign ==
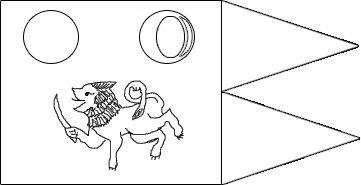
Flag of King Dutugamunu, as depicted in the Dambulla Viharaya cave no.2

By the age of sixteen Gamani was 'vigorous, renowned, intelligent and a hero in majesty and might', if a little wayward. Determined to expel the invading king of Rajarata, Gamani levied an army from around Rohana and declared his intention to regain the north to his father. The king forbade this stating that 'the land on this side of the river is enough'; the resulting exchange between father and son saw Gamani being dubbed 'Duttha Gamani', his friends fleeing to Malaya, and he himself being incarcerated in a royal prison.

Kavantissa is known as a brilliant strategist who recognized early that he needed to make his kingdom powerful before waging war against the invaders. He assembled armies and made his kingdom prosperous in "rice and betel leaf" - this meant that the people had a lot of agricultural surplus. The legendary ten "great giants" - men who had great strength – were brought into the army at this time. Kavantissa repeatedly made Dutugamunu and Tissa swear that they would never fight one another and that they would always respect and listen to the advice of the priests. He also made the ten giants swear never to pick sides in a war between the brothers.

Upon Kavantissa's death, Dutugemunu found himself having to defend his crown against his younger brother Tissa, who had seized possession of not only the elephant Kandula but the dowager queen Viharamahadevi as well. The war between the two began with a defeat for Dutugamunu at Culanganiyapitthi, where 'many thousands of the king's (Dutugamunu's) men' perished. Dutugamunu was forced to flee back to Mahagama where he levied another army and engaged Tissa in yet another battle in the vicinity of the city. Legend recounts that Tissa, riding the royal elephant Kandula, fought against his brother Dutugemunu, who was mounted on a mare. At one point, Dutugemunu urged his mare to leap over the elephant, prompting Kandula to recognize its true master and turn against Tissa, nearly killing him. Tissa narrowly escaped by dismounting onto a tree. Dutugemunu emerged victorious, while Tissa was secretly removed from the battlefield disguised as the corpse of a monk. It is said that Dutugemunu saw through the ruse and rebuked his brother, calling out, "Are you not ashamed to be carried on the backs of these priests?" Some time later, however, the brothers were reconciled through the efforts of Queen Viharamahadevi and the monks, after which Tissa became one of Dutugemunu’s foremost generals.

== Gaining of Rajarata ==
Flag of King Dutugamunu in traditional Sinhalese colours

Having secured his throne, he then planned his operations to conquer the north, which included not only Rajarata but numerous smaller semi-independent polities. The king's army consisted of 'chariots, troops anderal beasts for riders', soldiers and a number of war elephants, as well as a number of monks (to advise the King) and a relic placed in his spear for luck and blessings. In addition he was accompanied by the famed Ten Giant Warriors who had been recruited from all over the island by his father Kavantissa – Nandhimitra, Suranimala, Mahasona, Theraputtabhya, Gotaimbara, Bharana, Vasabha, Khanjadeva, Velusamanna, and Phussadeva.

The campaign saw Dutugamunu subduing a number of usurping Tamil rulers in the north (as many as 32, according to the Mahavamsa). Of particular interest is the four-month siege of Vijitanagara, where the defending Tamil troops are said to have used 'red-hot iron and molten pitch' to panic Dutugamunu's elephants. During this time he also married Ran Etana, the daughter of a chieftain who continued to pay homage to Elara of Anuradhapura. On at least two occasions victory is attributed to the king's 'cunning' and the bravery of Kandula. The campaign reached a climax at the eastern gate of Anuradhapura, where Dutugemunu, riding Kandula, finally confronted the aged usurped king Elara, on his own elephant Mahäpabbata, and slew him with a spear; the encounter is one of the most famous in Sri Lankan history.

Dutugamunu's victory at Anuradhapura put him in the unprecedented position of ruling nearly the entire island of (Sri) Lanka. Despite this, however, his position was far from problem-free. Elara, though an invading Tamil ruler from the Chola Empire of South India, was renowned for his just and righteous rule, and Dutugemunu went to great lengths to honor the memory of the old king: he cremated Elara, built a tomb for his ashes, and decreed that all travelers passing by must dismount and pay their respects at the site. Furthermore, 'looking back upon his glorious victory, great though it was, [he] knew no joy, remembering that thereby was wrought the destruction of thousands of both enemies and his soldiers' but the casualties mentioned in Mahavamsa is greatly exaggerated. This is attested to by the sheer number of religious foundations attributed to him by the chronicles (between 68 and 99), which include magnificent stupas, monasteries, and shrines.

== Reign and construction work ==
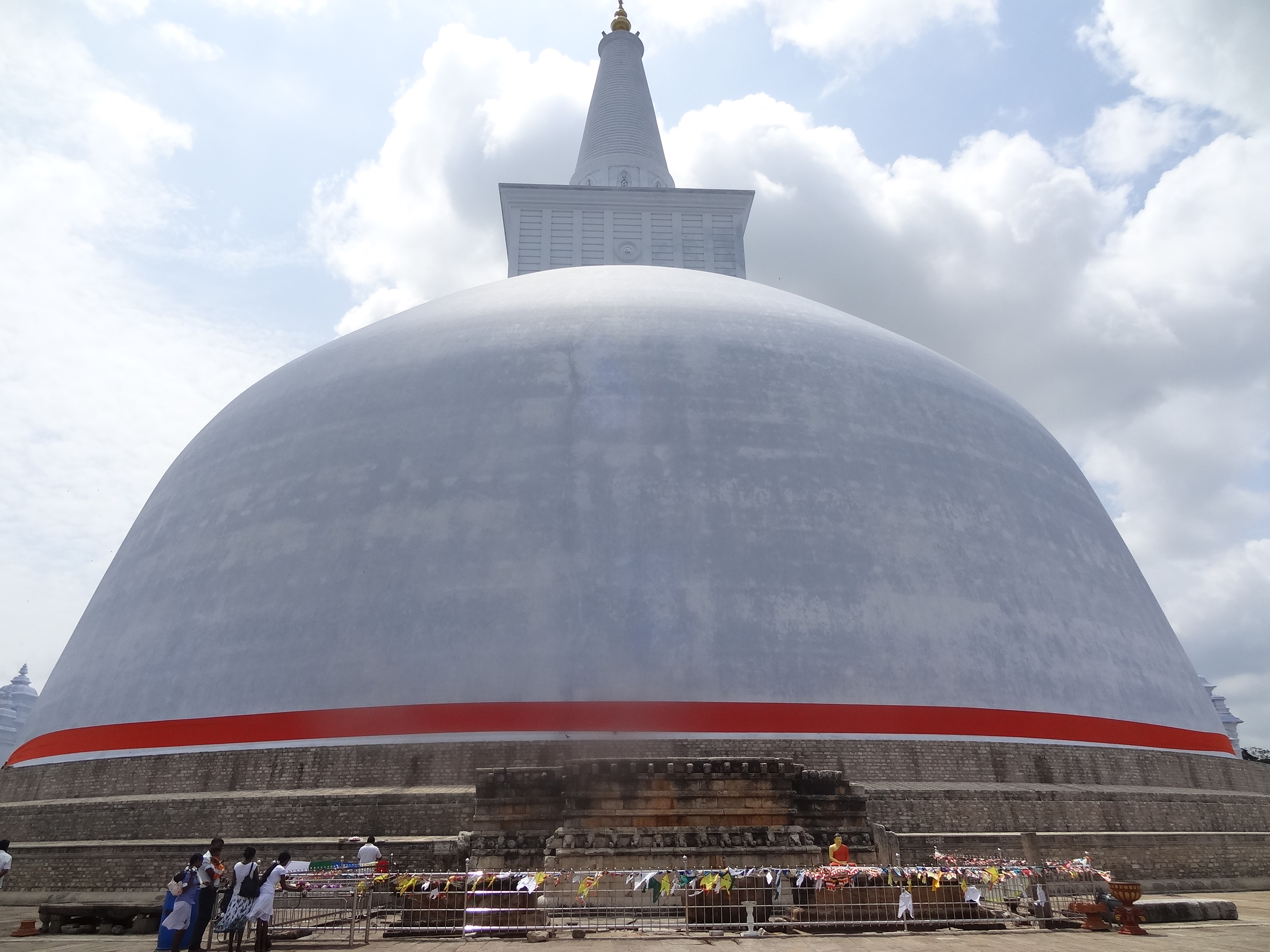
Ruwanveliseya, King Dutugamunu's most famous construction; it currently stands at over 90 metres in height and 91 metres in diameter

Aside from his many construction projects Dutugemunu's reign is memorable for his estrangement from his son, Saliya or Salirajakumara. The Prince fell in love with a girl called Agokamaladevi or Asokamala; unfortunately for all concerned she was of the Chandala caste, one of the lowest castes in Sinhalese society. Saliya refused to give her up and rejected the throne. While the Mahāvaṃsa makes no mention of reconciliation, folk traditions suggest that the young couple was eventually restored to the king’s favor.

The king's reign also saw extensive contact between Sri Lanka and traders from the west, including Arabs, Persians, and possibly Romans

Following the consolidation of his position Dutugemunu began a series of huge construction projects, many of which still survive in Anuradhapura today. As with nearly everything in Dutugemunu's life, each foundation comes with its own legend, many of which reveal the preoccupations and inclinations of ancient Sinhalese society.

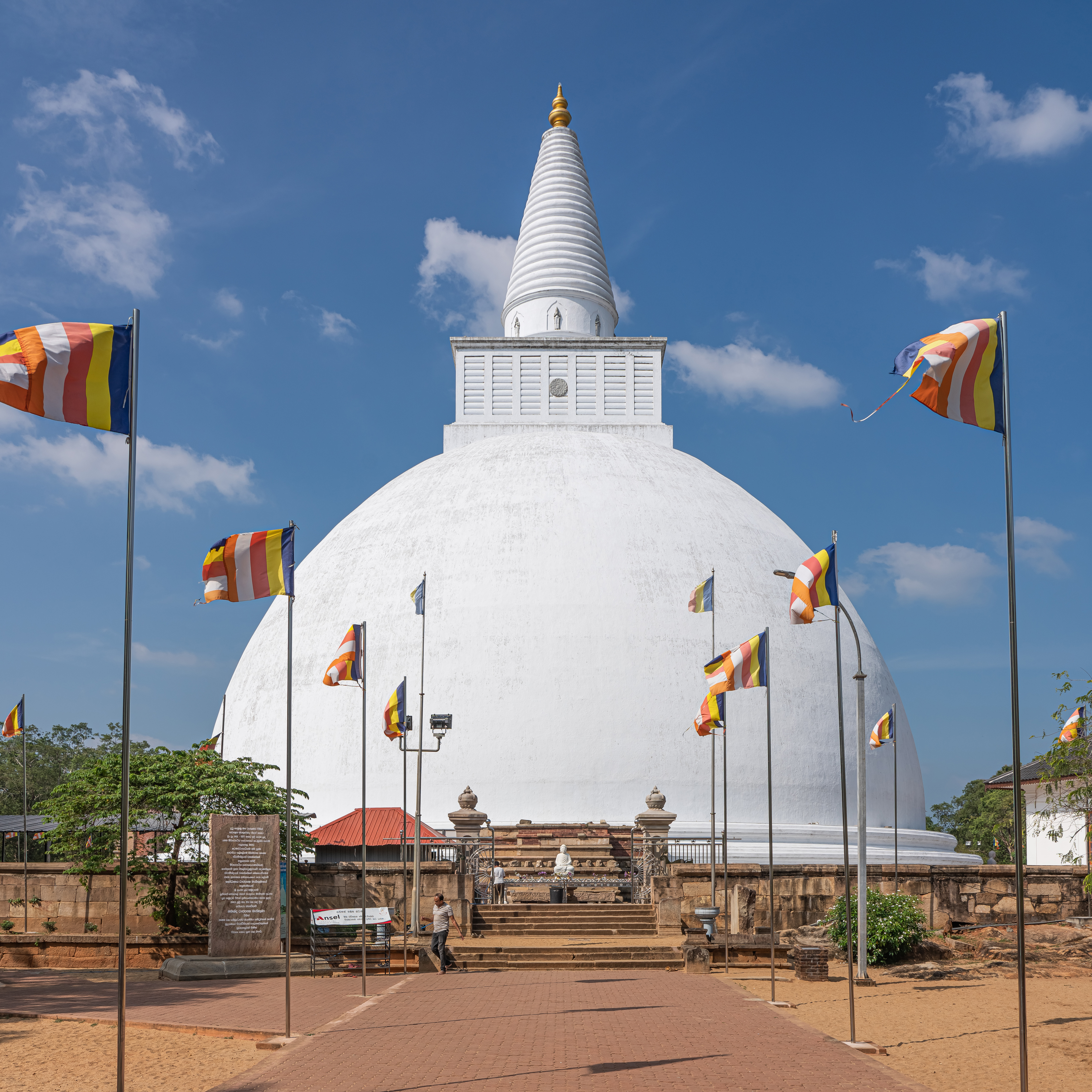
The Mirisawetiya Stupa in Anuradhapura, traditionally said to have been built by Dutugemunu

The first foundation mentioned in the Mahavamsa is the Maricavatti vihara, the modern Mirisavetiya. Legend has it that traveling to the shore of the Tank of Tissa with the 'women of the harem' for a water-festival, Dutugemunu planted his spear (which contained a sacred relic) in the soft ground. When preparing to return to the palace, he found that neither he nor anyone in his presence could pull it out. Taking this as a sign he ordered the construction of a stupa over the spear. Dutugemunu also ordered the construction of the Lohapasada, or Brazen Palace, a nine-story chapter house for monks, which derived its name from its bright copper-tiled roof. Again, legend has it that the design for the palace was based on a building seen in one of the heavens by a group of monks, who drew the design with 'red arsenic on linen' and dispatched it to the king.

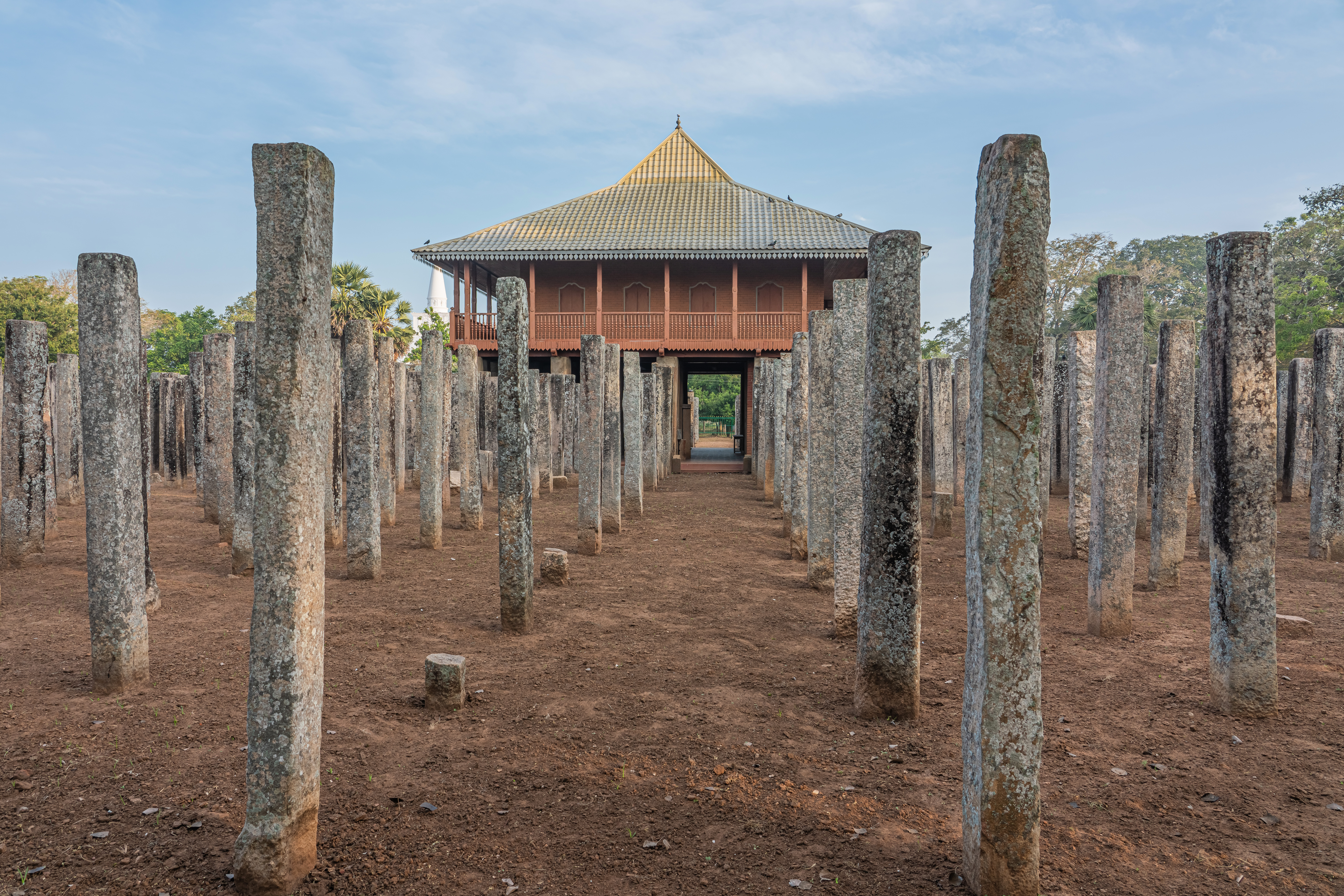
Lovamahapaya

Perhaps his most famous creation was the Ruwanweliseya, also known as the Great Stupa or Swarnamalee Chetiya, to house the begging bowl of the Buddha. The construction was started on the full moon day of the month of Vesak (traditionally the date of the birth, enlightenment, and passing away of the Buddha) with the creation of a foundation of crushed rock. To hammer the stones into place elephants were used with their feet bound in leather. Dutugemunu is said to have overseen the work personally, being present at the construction of the relic chamber and the interring of the bowl itself. The dedication of a stupa is described in Chap. 29 of the Mahavamsa, which lists the visit of delegations from various parts of India, as well as a delegation of 30,000 monks from Alexandria of the Caucasus, led by the Indo-Greek monk Mahadharmaraksita.

Other notable works include the construction of a stupa in Mundeshiwari, current day Bihar, India.

== Spiritual relationship with god "Kataragama" ==
Stories relating to some of the king's constructions reflect a spiritual relationship with the Kataragama deviyo. Two such sites are Henakaduwa Purana Raja Maha Viharaya at Tangalle and Ruhunu Kataragama Maha Devalaya.

During the period of preparations for war with Elara, the Kataragama deity appeared in front of King Dutugemunu and gave him a sword for him to use in the war at the present-day site of Henakaduwa temple (hena and Kaduna, meaning thunder and sword respectively in Sinhalese).

After defeating Elara in single combat in the Battle of Vijithapura and subsequently regaining power in the country, the Kataragama deity appeared yet again before Dutugemunu while the latter was in meditation at Kiri Vehera, Kataragama. The victorious king asked the deity what should be done in return for the deity's help in winning the battle. The god replied by shooting an arrow in the direction of Wedihiti Kanda from Kiri Vehera and instructed Dutugemunu to build a shrine where the arrow lands.

== Death and succession ==
King Dutugemunu did not live to see the Ruwanweliseya completed, dying before the plaster work was finished. The Mahavamsa dedicates a chapter to his death, which contains a scene where the dying king is taken by palanquin to the vicinity of the incomplete stupa. There he also encounters his old colleague Theraputtbhya, now a monk. After some discussion of the mortality of men, the aged monarch passes away and is immediately reborn in the heavenly realm of Tusita.

A common folk tale surrounding the death of King Dutugemunu is that as he was dying he was told that Ruwanweliseya was completed in order to keep him happy. The well-intentioned plan went awry, however, when Dutugemunu asked to be shown the finished building. His brother Tissa had the entire building draped in white cloth to present the illusion of whitewash, and due to his failing eyesight Dutugemunu did not spot the difference, dying convinced that the building was finished.

Following his death Dutugemunu was succeeded by his brother Saddhatissa, rather than his disinherited son Saliya.

== In popular culture ==
- 2015 film Maharaja Gemunu emphasized the life of Dutugamunu until his fight with King Elara. Uddika Premarathna stars as Dutugamunu in the film. The film was directed by Jayantha Chandrasiri.
- The teledrama Gemunu Maharaja was telecasted on Hiru TV. Character was portrayed by Malinda Perera.
- The 1982 novel Winds of Sinhala is a fictionalized take on Dutugemunu's campaign to defeat King Elara

== See also ==
- Gemunu Watch
- Mahavamsa
- Ten Giant Warriors
- List of Sri Lankan monarchs
- History of Sri Lanka

== Notes ==
A.Sinhala: මහරජ, lit. 'Great King', Sinhala pronunciation: [maharadʒə]
B. Should not be confused with the Hindu and Sikh princely title Maharaja.

Dutugamunu the Great
Regnal titles
Preceded by Ellalan	King of Anuradhapura; 161 BC – 137 BC	Succeeded by Saddha Tissa
