= Kavan Tissa, Prince of Ruhuna =

Kavan Tissa
- King of Ruhuna
- Reign: 205–161 BC
- Predecessor: Ghotabhaya
- Successor: Dutthagamani
- Burial: Situlpawwa Temple
- Consort: Viharamahadevi
- Issue: Dutthagamani; Saddhatissa; Prince Deeghabhaya; Princess Mahila; Princess Samantha
- House: House of Vijaya
- Father: Ghotabhaya
- Religion: Theravāda Buddhism

Kavan Tissa, also known as Kaka vanna Tissa (Crow-coloured Tissa), was the king of the Kingdom of Ruhuna in the southern part of Sri Lanka. He ruled Ruhuna, at the same time as Kelani Tissa of Maya Rata. Kavan Tissa was a great-grandson of King Devanampiyatissa's youngest brother Mahanaga, and also the father of the King Dutugemunu.

== Sources ==
As with his son Dutugemunu, Kavan Tissa's figure is mostly swathed in myth and legend. The main source of information on his life is Mahavamsa, the historical chronicle about the kings of Sri Lanka, which portrays Kavan Tissa as "devoutly believing in the three gems, [and] he provided the brotherhood continually with... needful things".

== Life and legacy ==
In Wilhelm Geiger's rendering of the Mahavamsa Kavantissa is given as Kakavannatissa. Under that name, the Mahavamsa mentions him twice. In chapter 15 Kavantissa, or Kakavannatissa is the son of a king named Gothabhaya and father of king Abhaya better known as Dutthagamini, correctly spelt as Dutugemunu. Chapter 15 of the Mahavamsa has been called, either by Geiger or by previous scribes, "The acceptance of the Mahavihara". Chapter 22 of the Mahavamsa, "The birth of Prince Gamani" mentions of the city of Rohana where there are "still princes who have faith in the three gems" (Buddha, his Teaching, the Community of monastics). Chapter 22 describes the war against the Damila. This name of Damila occurs both in the Mahavamsa and in the Culavamsa (Small Chronicle).

== See also ==
- Mahavamsa
- List of monarchs of Sri Lanka
- History of Sri Lanka
