= Sri Lankan units of measurement =

A number of different units of measurement were used in Sri Lanka to measure quantities like length, mass and capacity from very ancient times. Under the British Empire, imperial units became the official units of measurement and remained so until Sri Lanka adopted the metric system in the 1970s.

== Traditional units ==
Various units were used in Sri Lanka at different times and some only in certain regions. Some of these remained in use well into the colonial period. The following is only a partial list.

=== Length ===
One cubit was equal to 0.464 m (18.5 in). The Bam̆ba (Fathom), still in use as of 2016, is the distance between a man's outstretched arms. It is roughly 6 feet in length. "Bam̆ba" is usually used to measure depth in wells and pits. Units used in measuring long distances included the "Gavuva", "Yoduna", and "Usaba" (plurals Gavu and Yodun - a Yoduna was 4 Gavu) and the "hoo kiyana dura", which was the audible distance of a shout of 'hoo' by a person. Base of these system of measuring length was the human body.

- වියත (Viyatha = Span) Length of a spread hand
- රියන (Riyana = Cubit) Length from the elbow to middle finger
- බඹ (Bamba = Fathom) Length of two hands spread

King Nisshankamalla have established milestones called "Gaavutha Kanu" from a Gavu to another. Two of such have been found in Katugahagalge and Valigaththa in Southern Province.

The smallest unit was known as "Paramaanuwa", which was equal to 3.306×10^{−11} m (1.302×10^{−9} in), or slightly less than 1/3 of an angstrom. A typical span was taken roughly equal to 22.86 cm (9 in). These small units of measurement were used in making of statues and buildings. Following are the relationships between the units used in ancient times.

Ancient units of length in Ceylon
Smaller unit	=	Large unit	Metric approximation
		1 paramaanuwa	33.0667 pm
36 paramaanu	=	1 anu	1.1904 nm
36 anu	=	1 thajjaari	42.8544 nm
36 thajjaari	=	1 ratharenu	1.54 μm
36 ratharenu	=	1 likkha	55.54 μm
7 likkha	=	1 ukha	0.38878 mm
7 ukha	=	1 dhannamaasa	2.72143 mm (0.10714 in)
7 dhannamaasa	=	1 aangula	19.05 mm (0.75 in)
7 aangula	=	1 viyatha (Span)	228.6 mm (9 in)
2 viyatha	=	1 riyana (cubit)	457.2 mm (18 in)
7 riyana	=	1 yatthi	3.2004 m (10.5 ft)
4 yatthi	=	1 abbhantara	12.8 m (42 ft)
5 abbhantara	=	1 usabha	64 m (210 ft)
10 usabha	=	1 gavuva	640 m (2100 ft)
4 gavuva	=	1 yoduna	2560 m (8400 ft)

=== Area ===
Measurements of area used in ancient Sri Lanka was a system derived from paddy agriculture. Area was often measured in terms of the land that could be sown with a specific amount of seed or rice, including the pǣla, amuna, kiriya (4 amunas), and the riyana. In one region, a kiriya was about 8 acres. Following are relationships between some typical measures of area.

Sri Lankan ancient units of area
Smaller unit	=	Larger unit	Approximate value
		1 Laaha	49.5 sq ft (4.60 m^{2})
40 laaha	=	1 pǣla	1,980 sq ft (184 m^{2})
12 pǣla	=	12 kuruni	23,760 sq ft (2,207 m^{2})
44 kuruni	=	1 amuna	2 acres (0.81 ha)
1 amuna	=	25 kareesa	34,148 sq ft (3,172.5 m^{2})
4 amuna	=	1 kiriya	8 acres (3.2 ha)

In a stone inscription written by King Bhathikabhaya Abhaya at Dunumadalakanda in Anuradhapura District, it is stated that he offered a land of 1 kareesa to a temple in the area. In another stone inscription written by King Kutakannabhaya Thissa at Horiwila in Anuradhapura District, it is stated that he offered a land of 8 kareesa to a temple named 'Thissa' in the area.

James Prinsep, writing in 1840, stated that "at ... Ceylon ... English measures only are used, or at least a cubit based on the English measure of 18 inches."

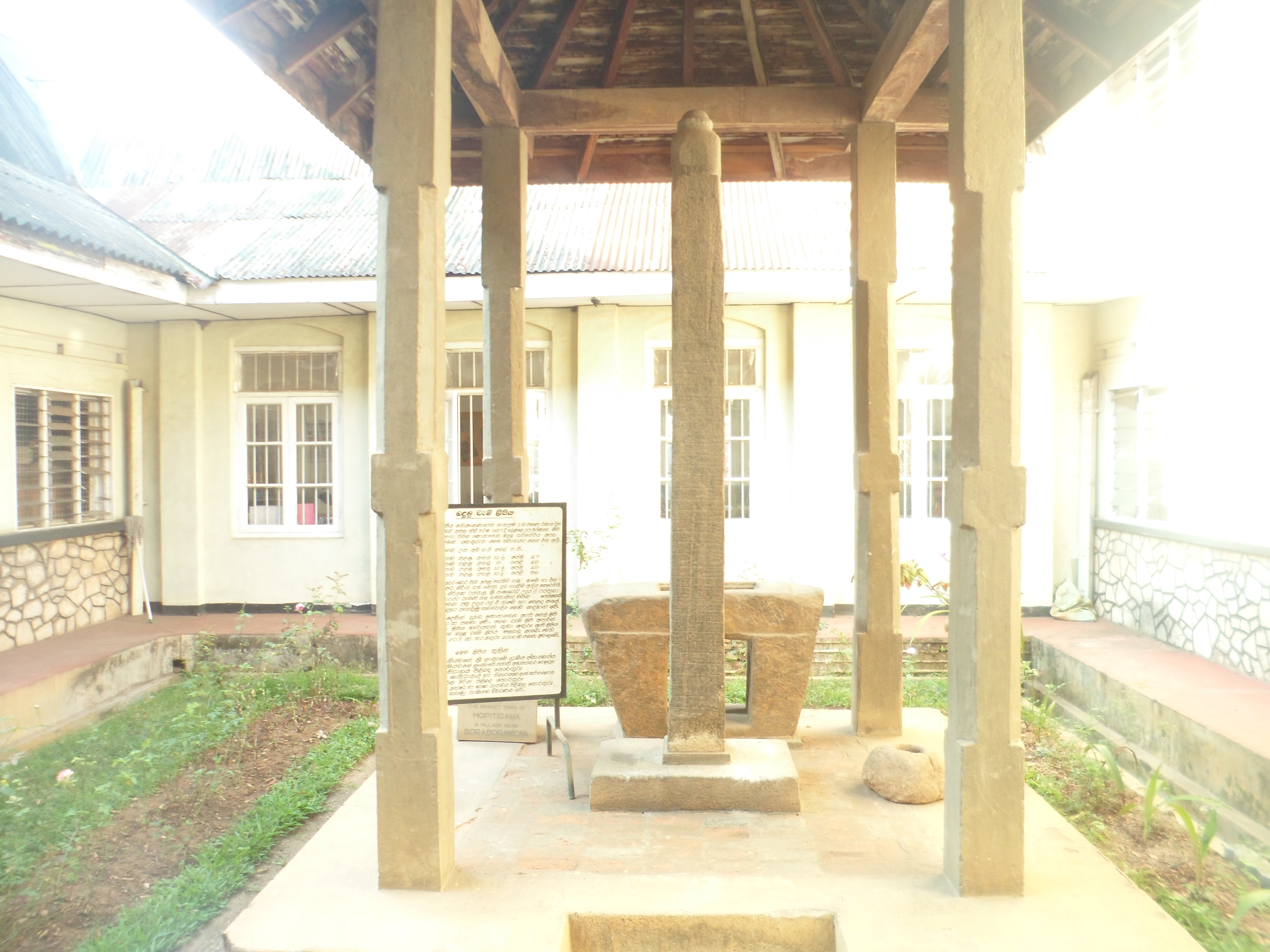
Badulla Pillar Inscription, in which prohibition of frauds in weighing is stated

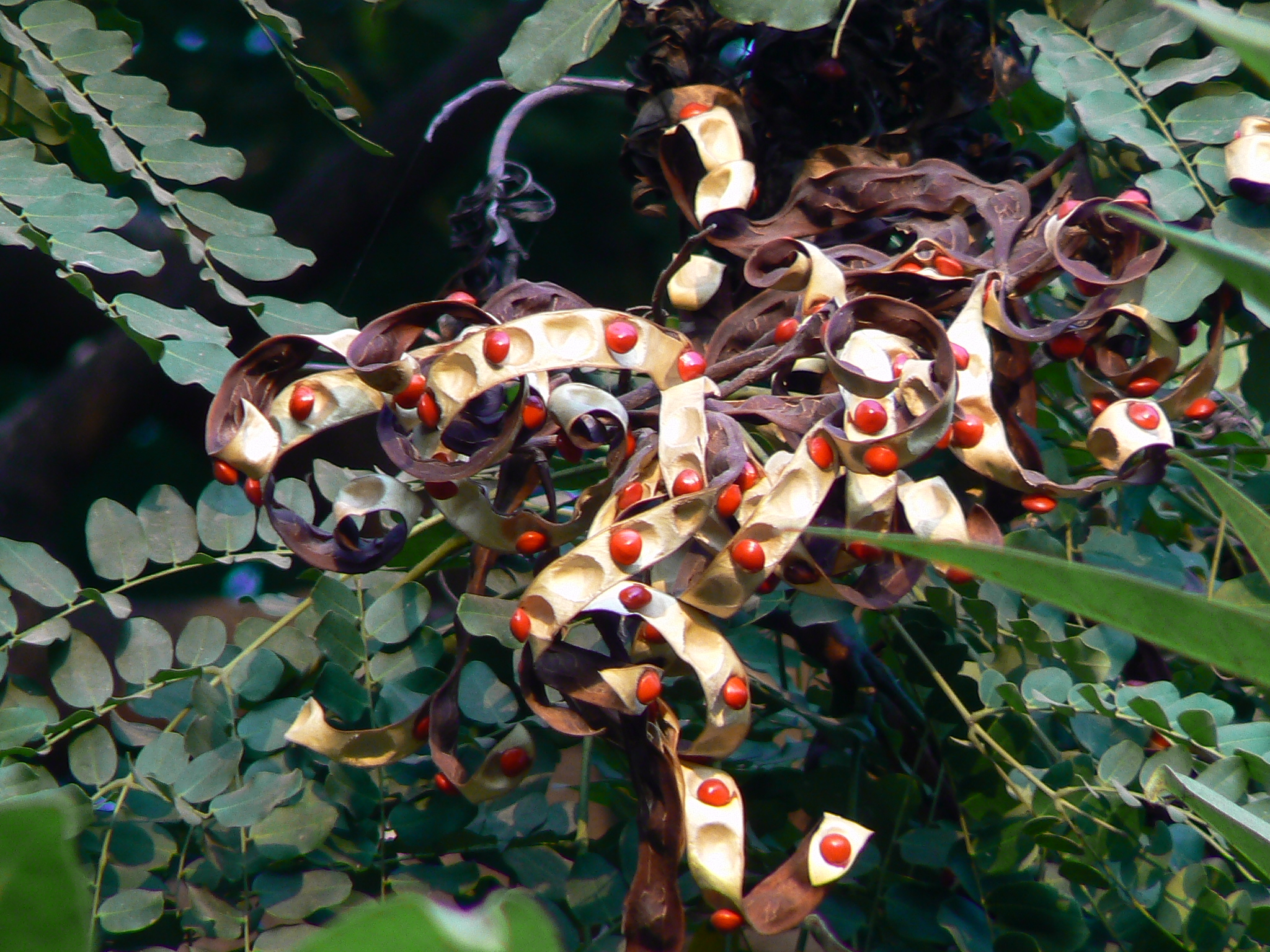
Madatiya ( Adenanthera pavonina ), which was a base unit used to measure small weights.

=== Weight ===
One candy, or one bahar, was equal to 226.8 kg, or 500 lbs, or according to The Indian Trader's Guide 480 Dutch pounds or 520 pounds Avoirdupois. Small weights could be measured in seeds, such as the Thala (Sesame), Amu, Vee (Rice) (3 Amu), Madati (8 Vee), Majadi, Maditi, Kalanda, and Manjadi. In ancient times, there have been an accurate system to measure weights. Following are some such weight measuring units used. Units like Madati ( Adenanthera pavonina ), Vee (Rice) are based on weights of those seeds.

It is stated that frauds in weighing was a punishable offence and only weights approved by the government should be used in weighing, in Sorabora Wewa Pillar Inscription (Badulla Pillar Inscription) which was written by King Udaya IV.

Sri Lankan Ancient Units of Weight
Smaller Unit	=	Larger Unit
4 Veeha	=	1 Gunja
2 Gunja	=	1 Maasaka
2 1/2 Maasaka	=	1 Aka
8 Aka	=	1 Dharana
5 Dharana	=	1 Swarna
2 Swarna	=	1 Pala

=== Capacity ===
Different units were used for liquid and dry capacity.

==== Liquid ====
One seer was equal to 1.2 quarts and one parrah was equal to 6.75 gallons. Another source suggests that a seer was equal to 1.86 imperial pints or 1.06 litres. These were mostly introduced in the period which coastal areas were governed by Portuguese and Dutch.

==== Dry ====
Units to measure dry capacities were mainly used in agriculture. Some of them are as following:

Sri Lankan Ancient Units of Dry Capacity
Smaller Unit	=	Large Unit
2 Patha / Koththu / Hundu	=	1 Mana
2 Mana	=	1 Seru
1 Seru	=	1 Bandara Naliya (Royally accepted base unit) / 1 Naliya
2 Seru	=	1 Serika
2 Serika	=	1 Laha / Yala / Kuruni *
2 Laha / Yala / Kuruni *	=	1 Marikkala
2 Marikkala	=	1 Thimba
2 Thimba	=	1 Busala
5 Laha / Yala / Kuruni *	=	1 Bera
2 Bera	=	1 Pala
4 Pala	=	1 Amuna

* capacity of Kuruni varies from area to area

One ammonam was equal to 203.4 L. One parrah = 1/8 ammonam, oneseer = 1/288 ammonam and the chundoo was equal to nearly half a pint.

Maccauly stated in 1818 that to the north of Colombo an Ammonam contained 16 Parahs, and 2 1/2 Ammonams equalled one Acre, but that to the south there were 8 Parahs to the Ammonam. He describes the Parah as a measure 16.7 inches wide and 5.6 inches deep.

Montgomery, writing in 1835, described the interior measurement of a Parrah as a perfect cube of 11.571 inches, and the seer as a cylinder of depth 4.35 inches and diameter 4.35 inches.

== See also ==
- Units of Measurement
- Measurement
- System of Measurement
- History of Measurement
