= Tissamaharama Raja Maha Vihara =

Ancient Buddhist monastery in Sri Lanka

- තිස්සමහාරාම රජ මහා විහාරය
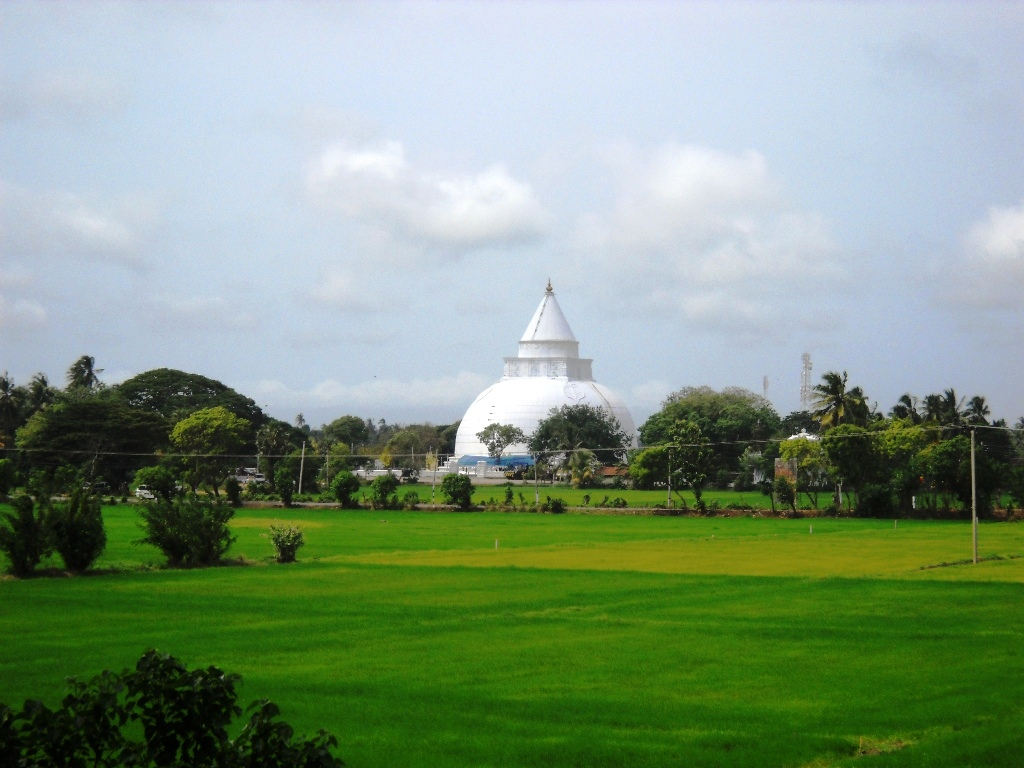
- View of Tissamaharama Stupa across the paddy fields in the that area.

Religion
- Affiliation: Buddhism
- District: Hambantota
- Province: Southern Province

Location
- Country: Sri Lanka
- Interactive map of Tissamaharama Raja Maha Vihara
- Coordinates: 6°16′46″N 81°17′25″E

Architecture
- Founder: King Kavan Tissa of Ruhuna
- Completed: Around 2nd century BC

The Tissamaharama Raja Maha Vihara is an ancient Buddhist temple in Tissamaharama, Southern Province of Sri Lanka. It was one of the four major Buddhist monasteries established in Sri Lanka, after the arrival of Arhant Mahinda Thera to the country. Tissamaharama monastery had been recognized as a pre-eminent Buddhist educational center of the southern Sri Lanka from the 3rd century B.C. to the 11th century A.D. The Tissamaharama Dagoba which is situated in the premises of the monastery is one of the largest stupas in Sri Lanka. The present chief incumbent of Tissamaharama Raja Maha Vihara is Ven. Devalegama Dhammasena Nayaka Thera.

== History ==
During the reign of emperor Asoka of India (304–232 BCE), many prominent Buddhist monks were sent as missionaries to neighboring kingdoms to propagate Buddhist philosophy. As a part of these missions, Arhant Mahinda Thera, the son of emperor Asoka arrived in Sri Lanka during the reign of king Devanampiya Tissa of Anuradhapura in 3rd century BC. After the establishment of Buddha Sasana in Sri Lanka, major Buddhist monasteries such as Anuradhapura Maha Viharaya and Mihintale Raja Maha Viharaya were established in the North central region of the country while Tissamaharama Raja Maha Viharaya and Sithulpawwa Rajamaha Viharaya were established in the Southern region. According to the chronicle Mahawamsa this temple was built in the 2nd century BC as Silapassa Pirivena, by then King Kavan Tissa (186-161 B.C.) of Ruhuna (Southern Sri Lanka) and in the reign of King Ilanaga (38-44 A.D.) the temple had been expanded and renovated. But according to some historians the temple was initially built by king Mahanaga in the 3rd century BC and later it was expanded as a major temple by king Kavan Tissa in the 2nd century BC.

The beginning of kingdom of Ruhuna dates back to the reign of king kalashoka in 2nd century BC. His younger brother Mahanaga left the then capital Anuradhapura to avoid an assassination attempt and moved to the southern area of the island and became the ruler of the area. Mahanaga is regarded as the first king of Ruhuna, where the capital of was Magama. King Mahanaga did a great service to improve agriculture and was responsible for raising a peaceful and prosperous civilization in the Southern Province of Sri Lanka. He was succeeded by his son Yatala-Tissa, who was able to rule the province virtuously. After Yatala-Tissa his son Gothabhaya became the king of the south, and by this time the kingdom of Ruhuna was well established and developed. After Gothabhaya, his son Kavan-Tissa succeeded to the throne. King Kawan Tissa is regarded as the founder of many Buddhist monasteries located in Southern and Eastern areas of Sri Lanka.

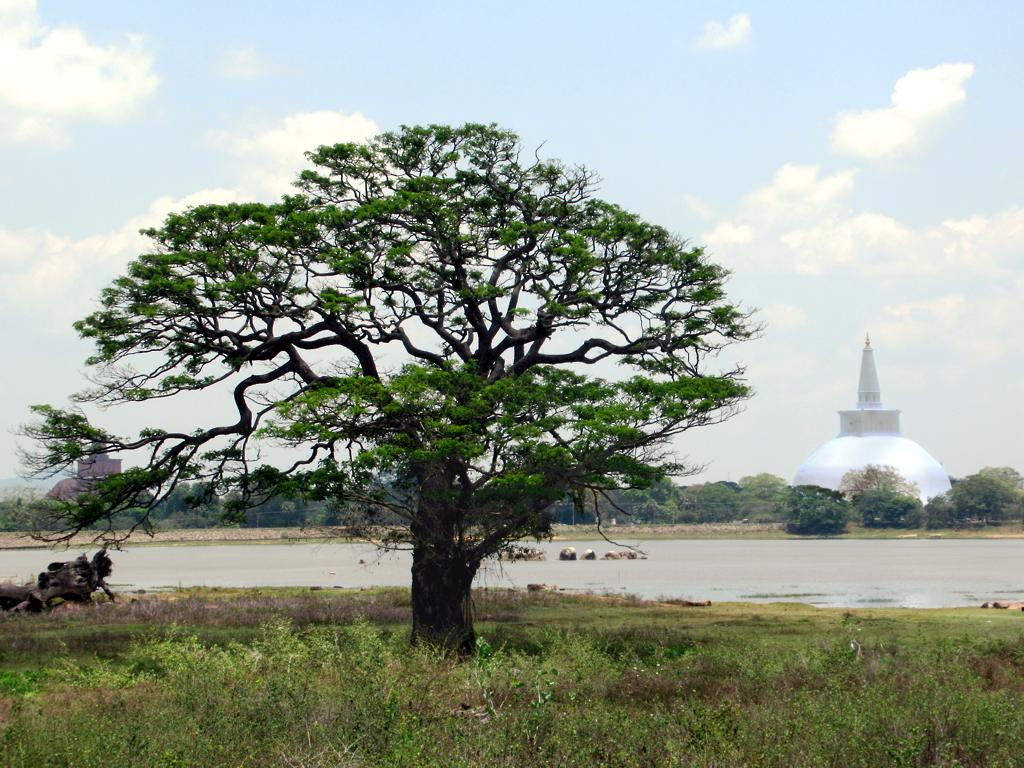
The stupa across the lake

Thissmaharama Vihara was the largest Buddhist monastery in historic Southern Sri Lanka. Some of the notable resident Buddhist monks of this great monastery includes Arhant Mahasiva Thera, Arhant Dhammadinna Thera and Arhant Pindapathika Tissa Thera. King Kawan Tissa who founded Tissmaharama Vihara also modified the Tissa wewa (tank) to cater the water requirement of Tissamaharama monastery, as well as for the irrigation purposes of surrounding area. Many ancient kings of Sri Lanka had also offered lands to the Tissamaharama monastery for the welfare of Buddhist monks who lived there. According to ancient stone inscriptions found, many land donations to the Tissamaharama Vihara were made during the reigns of king Jettha Tissa, Wasabha and Mihindu. From 3rd century to the 5th century the monastery owned more than 18 000 acres of land. These land donations were made by the kings for the maintenance work of the monastery and the stupa as well as for the needs of the resident monks.

First evidences of renovating Tissamaharama Vihara goes to the reign of king Illanaga in 38 AD, after two centuries of its initial construction. King Voharaka Tissa (215 -237 AD) in the 3rd century had also made some renovations to the stupa. Prince Mahanaga renovated the stupa in 560 AD, when the status of the stupa deteriorated once again in the 6th century. It had also undergone renovations during the reign of king Vijayabahu I (1055-1110 AD). But later Thissamaharama Vihara was raided by the armies of invader Kalinga Magha in the 13th century. It appears that no major restoration work was done on this stupa till the last half of the 19th century after this rifling. However sources reveal that in 1662 AD, king Veera Parakrama Narendrasinghe donated two lands to the temple for the maintenance purposes, when Kadurupokune Budhdha Rakkhitha Thero was the chief incumbent. But later in the 18th century Tissmaharama Vihara was abandoned after the state of the temple deteriorated badly, during the Dutch Colonial rule in the coastal areas of Sri Lanka.

== Great stupa ==
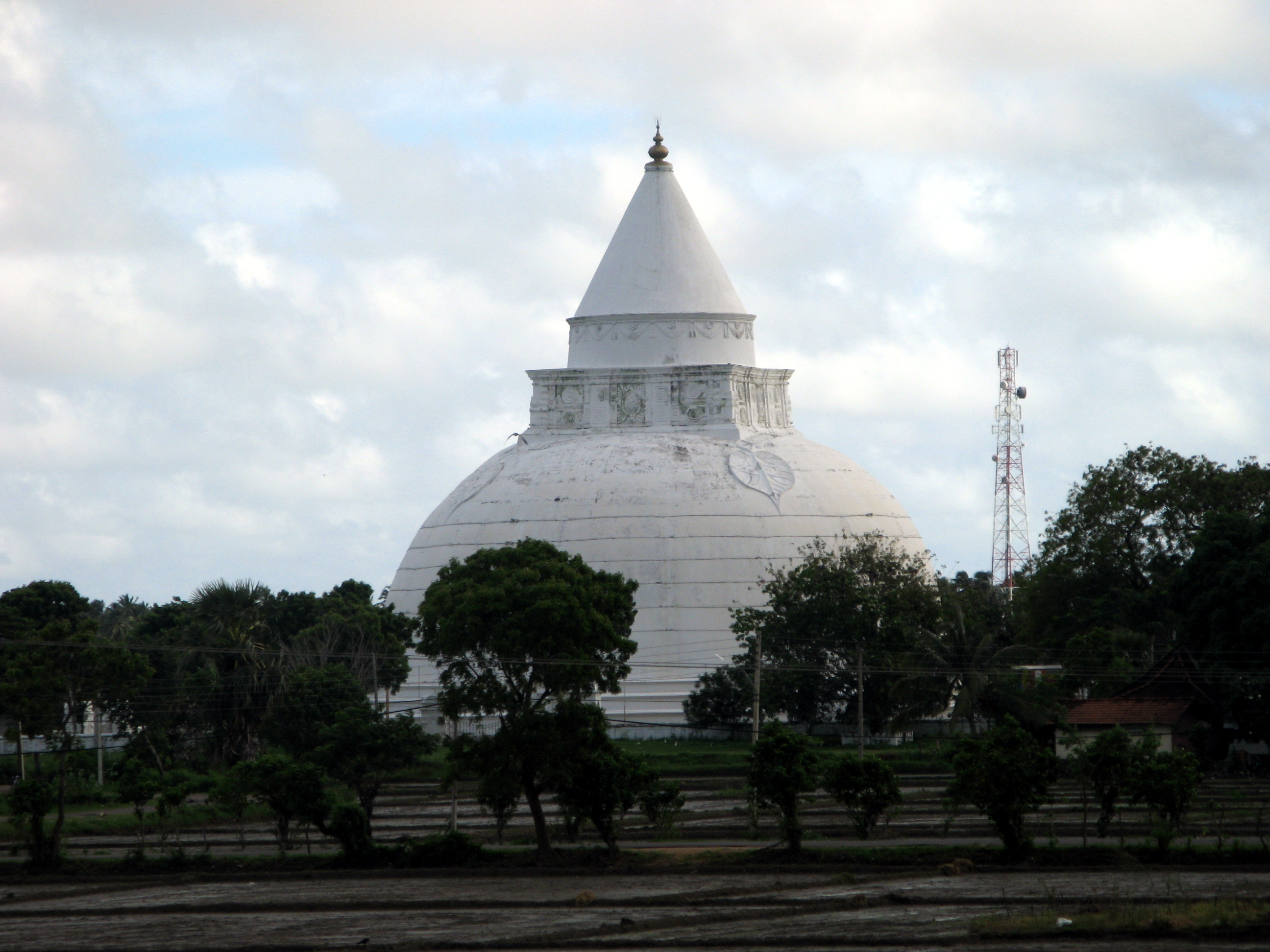
Tissamaharama stupa

Tissamaharama Stupa is the largest stupa in the Southern region of the country with a height of 156 feet and 550 feet in circumference. According to chronicles, King Kawan Tissa had sought blessings and instructions from Arhant Gothama Thera, who was a spiritual adviser to the king, when constructing Tissamaharam stupa. The stupa was built to commemorate Buddha's visit to the area, at the same place where Buddha spent time in meditation with 500 arhant Buddhist monks. The stupa which has a 'Bubble Shape' and was built by using bricks on a square platform made of granite stones. King Kawan-tissa received the instructions of Buddhist monks throughout the construction period of the stupa. The relics enshrined in this stupa is subjected to debate. According to Mahavamsa the frontal bone relic (Lalata Dhathu) is enshrined in Tissamaharam stupa as the main relic. However some believe that the frontal bone relic of Buddha was temporally enshrined in this stupa but later it was enshrined in the Seruwila Mangala Raja Maha Vihara. A recent discovery of a pillar inscription in Kirinda, reveals that the left tooth relic of Buddha was also enshrined in this stupa.

== Restoration ==
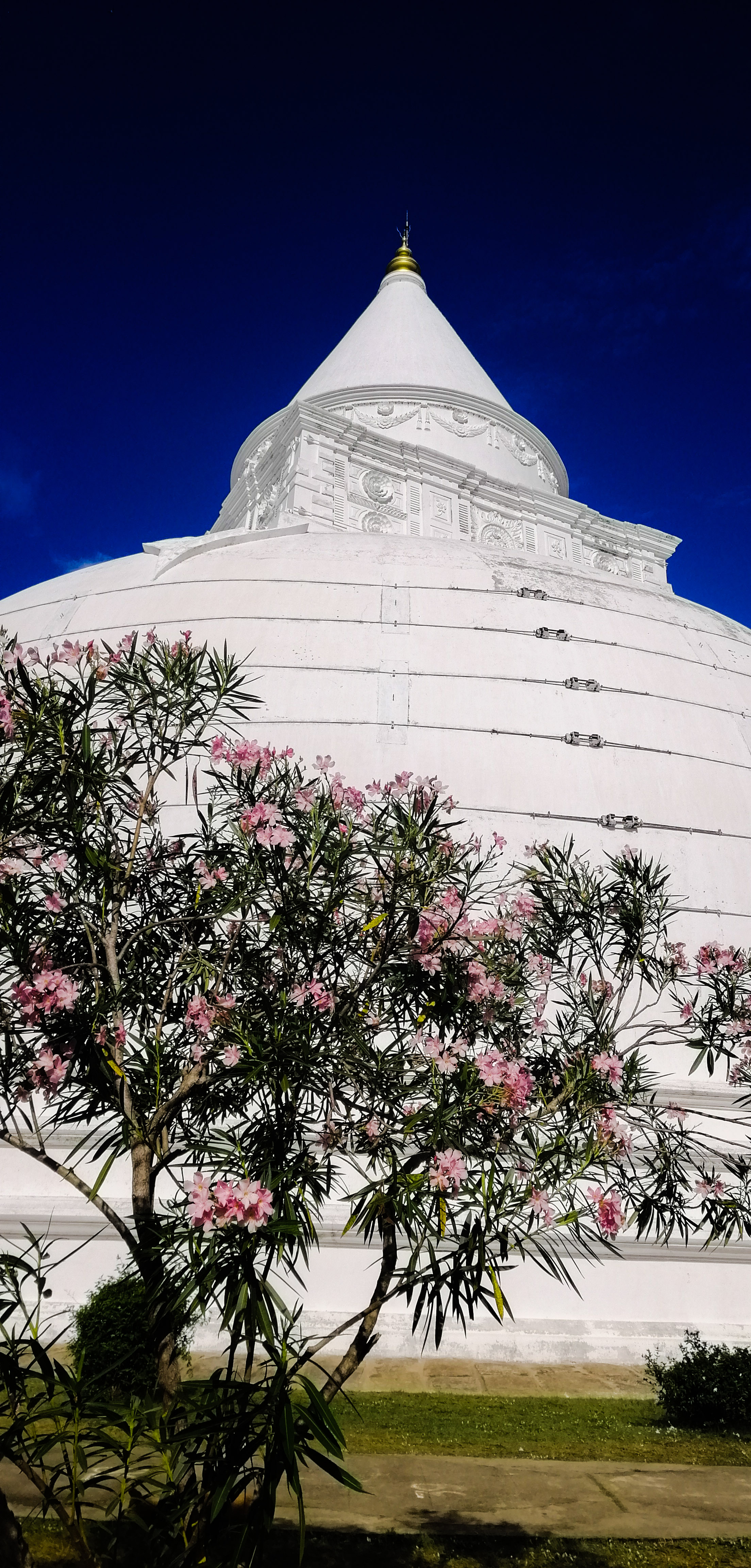
Steel cable tendons are used to structurally stabilize the dome

The more recent restoration work of this stupa had begun in 1858 due to the efforts of Wepathaira Sumana Thera, who rediscovered Thissmaharama Vihara after making a pilgrimage to the area. He built a hut in the vicinity of the stupa and started living there to supervise the restoration works by himself. It took 16 years to complete the renovation work of the Garbhaya, semi spherical part of the stupa which is 86 feet in height. But Wepathaira Sumana Thera could not complete the restoration of Thissmaharama stupa in his lifetime and after the death of Wepathaira Sumana Thera, Walpita Medhankara Thero, a monastic brother of Wepathaira Sumana Thera took over the renovation works. By 1878 Walpita Medhankara Thero managed to complete the restoration of Hatharaskotwa of the stupa and enshrined relics in it.

In 1882 the British governor general of Ceylon, Sir James Robert Longden visited Thissamaharama Vihara and appointed Walpita Medhankara Thero as the chief incumbent of the temple. He also vested the power to Siyam Nikaya to take care of Tissamaharama Raja Maha Vihara. In 1895 Walpita Medhankara Thero managed to complete the work of Dewatha Kotuwa and enshrined relics there. In 1897 the Tissamaharama Raja Maha Vihara development committee was formed with the leadership of Mudaliyar S. F. Jayawickrama of Matara and N. Amarasingha of Tangalle and the restoration works completed in early 20th century. In 1900 the Koth Kerella of the stupa was completed and placing the pinnacle (Chuda Manikya) of the stupa was done on Poson poya day of 1900. The pinnacle consists of a red colour gem which was imported from Bohemia.

Tissamaharama stupa had developed a series of vertical cracks right round the dome of the stupa and in some other parts around in 1990. The department of Archeology of Sri Lanka and State Engineering Co-operation intervened on the request of chief incumbent of the temple and prevented further cracking of the stupa by using galvanized steel cables tied around the circumference of the dome in the midsection. This final repair works were completed in February 1998 at a total cost of 6 million Sri Lankan rupees.

== See also ==
- Yatala Vehera
- Sithulpawwa Rajamaha Viharaya
