= Tissa Wewa =

Tissa Wewa may refer to any of the following:

- Tissa Wewa (Anuradhapura), the artificial lake near Anuradhapura in Sri Lanka
- Tissa Wewa (Tissamaharama), the artificial lake near Tissamaharama in Sri Lanka
