= Yatala Vehera =

Ancient Buddhist stupa in Deberawewa - Thissamaharama, Hambantota District, Sri Lanka

- යටාල වෙහෙර
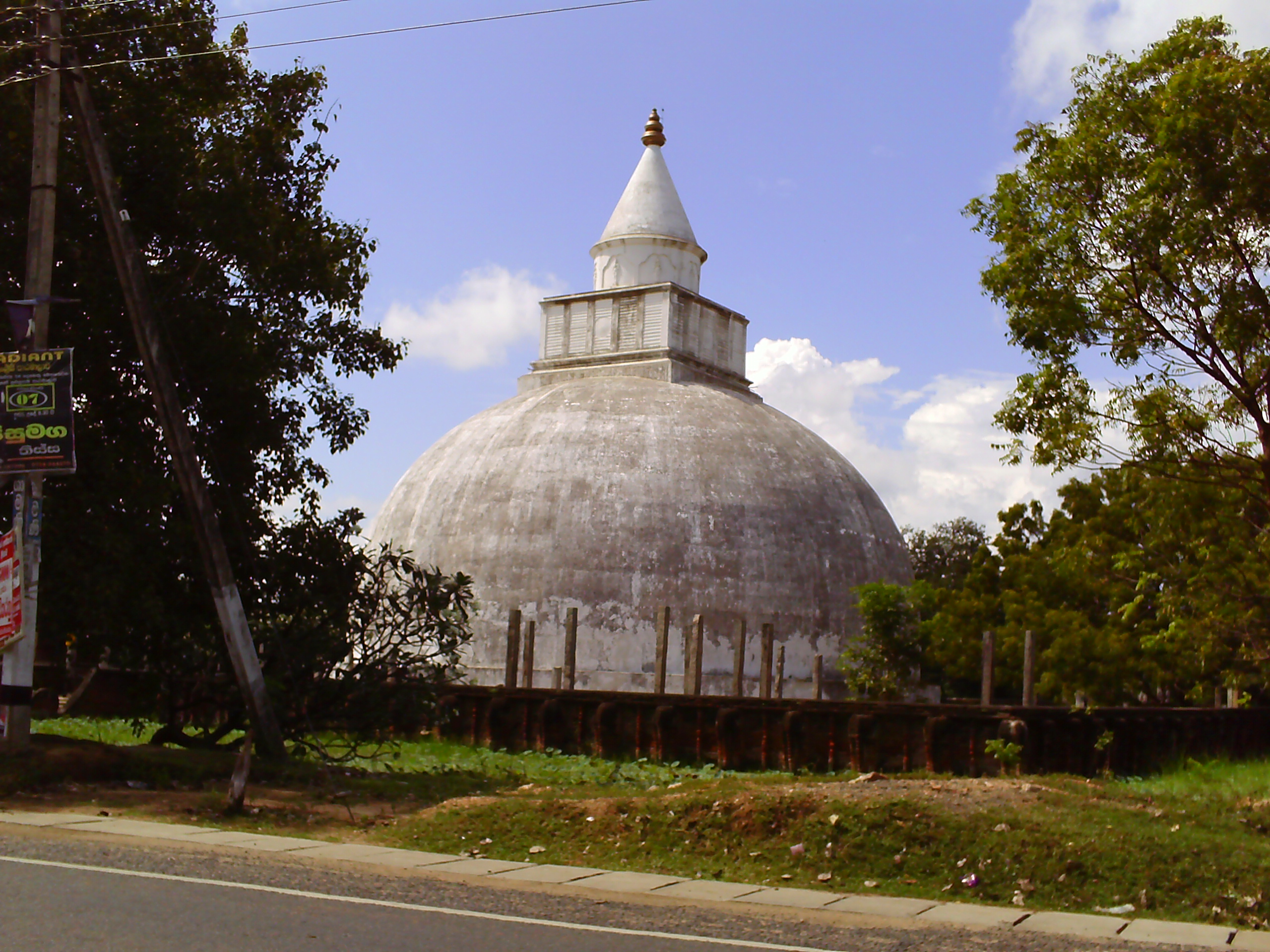

Religion
- Affiliation: Buddhism
- District: Hambantota
- Province: Southern Province

Location
- Location: Deberawewa, Tissamaharama
- Country: Sri Lanka
- Interactive map of Yatala Vehera
- Coordinates: 6°17′08″N 81°16′33″E

Architecture
- Type: Buddhist Temple
- Founder: Mahanaga of Ruhuna; Yatala Tissa of Ruhuna
- Completed: Around 3rd century BC

Yatala Vehera (also spelled Yatala Wehera) is an ancient Buddhist stupa dating back to the 3rd Century B.C, located in Deberawewa - Thissamaharama in Hambantota District of Sri Lanka. The stupa is built on a stage made of large flat granite stones and has a surrounding wall of sculpted elephant heads, a moat and a large moonstone. It is believed that the stupa was built 2300 years ago by regional king Yatala Thissa of Ruhuna to commemorate the place where he was born. However some believe that the stupa was built by regional king Mahanaga, father of Yatala Thissa to mark the birth of his son.

In various historical documents and chronicles, this stupa has been also referred as Mani Chethiya and Yattalaya. It is not known what was enshrined in this stupa but a large number of relic caskets has been discovered in the stupa. It is believed that this stupa was offered to Arahant Arittha Thero, who was the first Sinhalese arahant, by the regional king of Ruhuna. This stupa is also believed to be the first stupa built in the kingdom of Ruhuna. The restoration work of the Yatala dagaba commenced in 1883 AD and It took over a century to complete the restoration. A small opening has been left in the renovated stupa to observe the different phases of construction.

== See also ==
- Thissamaharama Viharaya
- Sithulpawwa Rajamaha Viharaya
