= Tissamaharama =

- Town
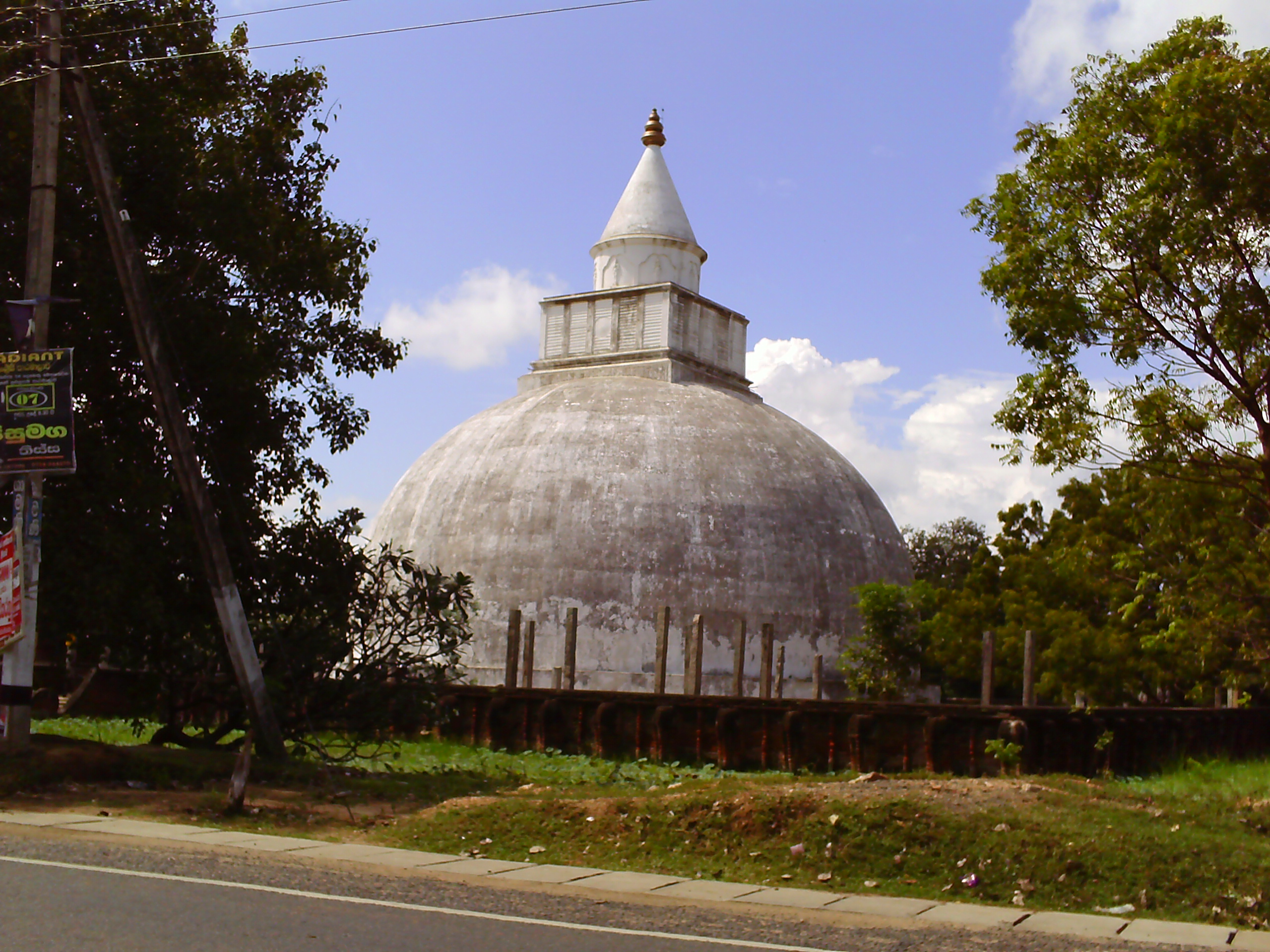
- Yatala Vehera Stupa

- Location in Sri Lanka
- Coordinates: 6°17′N 81°17′E
- Country: Sri Lanka
- Province: Southern Province
- District: Hambantota District

Area
  - Total: 840 sq mi (2,180 km^{2})
- Elevation: 62 ft (19 m)

Population
  - Total: 79,618 in 2,011
- Time zone: +5.30

Tissamaharama (Sinhala: තිස්සමහාරාමය [ˈtissəmaˌhaːˈraːməyə], Tamil: திஸ்ஸமஹாராம) is a town in Hambantota District, Southern Province, Sri Lanka.

== History ==
It was the capital of the Kingdom of Ruhuna as early as the 3rd century B.C. Few buildings from that period survived. The presence of early Tamils in Tissamaharama was confirmed following archaeological excavations in 2010. The Tissamaharama Tamil Brahmi inscription, a fragment of black and red ware flat dish inscribed in Tamil in the Tamil Brahmi script was excavated at the earliest layer in the town.

The large, artificial Tissa Wewa lake, which was a part of an irrigation system, dates from that time. The five main nearby lakes are Tissa Wewa; Yoda Wewa; Weerawila Wewa; Pannegamuwa Wewa; and Debarawewa Wewa.

The town mainly serves as a starting point for visits to Yala National Park and Kataragama.

== Archaeology ==
The archaeological excavations brought to light earliest urban phase in the 4th century BC. Fired bricks, Buddhist saddle querns, a potsherd with triangular sail (excavated from the layer of 1st century BC but on stylistic grounds were assigned to 3rd century BC), a hospital from 1st century AD-2nd century AD, (the earliest in south Asia), stone paved streets with drains and water channels dated before the Common Era, roof tiles, houses with plastered exterior etc. A Tissamaharama potsherd with alleged Tamil Brahmi inscription was unearthed, however the scripts revealed a unique language.

== See also ==
- Tissamaharama Raja Maha Vihara
- Tissa Wewa lake
- Yatala Vehera
