= Tissamaharama inscription No. 53 =

Tissamaharama inscription No. 53 refers to a fragment of black and red ware flat dish inscribed in Brahmi script excavated at the earliest layer in southern town of Tissamaharama in Sri Lanka. It is dated to approximately 200 BC by German scholars who undertook the excavation.

There are differences of opinion among scholars about the reading and interpretation of this inscription. The reading of this inscription by Iravatham Mahadevan in Tamil was accepted by P. Ragupathy but he rejected the Mahadevan's interpretation. Other scholars such as Harry Falk, Raj Somadeva and P. Pushparatnam rejected both the reading and interpretations by Mahadevan as well as Ragupathy. As a result of these disagreements between the scholars, the reading and interpretation of this legend as a Tamil-Brahmi inscription has become controversial today.

== The reading of the inscription ==
According to Mahadevan and P. Ragupthy, this inscription is a combination of readable Brahmi and Megalithic graffiti symbols that are usually found in megalithic and early historic pottery in South India and Sri Lanka. They believe that the first three letters, from left to right, of this inscriptions are Brahmi letters, the next two are symbols followed by two Brahmi letters. There is a vertical line, away from the legend that may mark the end of the legend. Expressing their views on this, the archeologist and etymologist, Ragupthy and epigraphist Mahadevan both read this inscription as thiraLi muRi - written agreement of the assembly.

However, the other scholars rejected the above views by both Mahadevan and Ragupathy. Somadeva who expressed his views on this inscription emphasized that this is a usual Brahmi inscription found in Sri Lanka. Rejecting the reading by Mahadevan, he read this inscription as Purathi Utharasha Mudi - the vessel of fried grain of Uttara. Falk, who also considered the letters appear on the potsherd as Brahmi, read the inscription as Shamuda. However, disagreeing with Somadeva and Falk, Pushparatnam identified this as a Tamil-Brahmi inscription and read it as Pullaitti Muri - container belonging to Pullaitti. He submitted doubt about the right to left reading but agreed the second letter from the left has a unique characteristic of Tamil Language.

=== Readings by scholars ===
- Mahadevan (2010) read it as Tirali Muri and gave the meaning as written agreement of the assembly. He further postulates that it indicates the presence of a Tamil trade guild in Southern Sri Lanka in the 2nd century BCE.
- Ragupathy (2010) also read it as Tirali Muri but interpreted as a vessel specified for the purpose of serving rice portions. He postulates that it indicates the presence of common people not a trade guild.
- Somadeva (2010) read the inscription as Purathi Utharasha Mudi - the vessel of fried grain of Uttara. He emphasized that the inscription appears on this potsherd is Brahmi and not Tamil-Brahmi as interpreted by Mahadevan
- Falk (2014) introduced this as a piece of a dining plate with an alleged Tamil legend. He took the letters appear on the potsherd as Brahmi and showed that the only single meaningful word that could be extracted from the inscription is Shamuda.
- Pushparatnam (2014) read this as Pulaitti muri, He tended to read this inscription from left to right (Pushparatnam, 2014). and showed that the second letter from left has a unique characteristic of the Tamil language

== The scripts of the inscription ==
According to Mahadevan, the first letter of the legend (from left to right) is Brahmi Li which is a palatal L. As no word begins with this letter in Tamil, Sinhala, Prakrit or Sanskrit, the word is read by Mahadevan by reading the three letters placed left to the symbols from right to left as tiraLi. However, Somadeva and Pushparatnam identified the first letter as Pu while folk thought that the first four letters from left to right as later enhancements without meaning.

Mahadevan, Ragupathy and Pushparatnam introduced the last letter of the legend (as read from left to right) as Ri which is a retroflex R. Retroflex R which is a unique phoneme found in Tamil and other related Dravidian languages. Mahadevan reads the last two letters placed right to the symbols from left to right as ‘muRi’. However, Somadeva identified the last letter as di and showed that letter is occasionally found in the Brahmi inscriptions in Sri Lanka. Falk also disagreed with Mahadevan and identified the last letter as da. He further commented on Mahadevan's views as follows;

Mahadevan took letters 4 and 5 as symbols, placed inside a running text as nowhere else. There are two symbols in Paranavitana 1970 nos. 1051 and 1052, but both end a full sentence. Mahadevan took the l+i+u as a miswritten Dravidian alveaolar l+u→lu, and he took the d+i+u as alveolar retroflex ra+i. But the form of the ra with a forked lower end always starts with a C-bend above (Mahadevan 2003: 221 chart 5B), not with a vertical as our letter da does.
That means that Mahadevan’s reading of a retrograde Tamil text (lirati →tirali + + murī) with its alleged meaning “Written agreement of the assembly”) is excluded as it presupposes too many exceptions: l+u+i hardly stand for li; if ti would have to be read, the letter would have been inscribed retrograde with an -i- hook placed on top of the vertical instead of lower down the vertical as in li, ni and di; ra would have a form which does not yet exist. Symbols in the middle of a sentence are unknown, as are Brāhmī texts on vessels written from right to left. His “text” constructs a word (tirali) which is not found anywhere else and the alleged meaning has absolutely nothing to do with a dining plate.

— Falk, 2014.

== Direction of the reading ==
According to P. Ragupathy Brahmi is usually written from left to right but in few occasions Tamil Brahmi was found to be written from right to left in Tamil Nadu. In Sri Lanka, some examples have been found in which Brahmi was written from right to left as well. But what is unique is this inscription is partly read from right to left and partly read from left to right, keeping symbols in the middle.

According to Pushparatnam, there is no proper reason to write some inscription from left to right and to write other inscription from right to left. He also emphasized that there are no evidence to prove these dual trends of writing inscriptions on pottery. Except the Mahadevan and Ragupathy, all others including Somadeva, Falk and Pushparatnam read the total inscription from left to right.

== Notes ==
- Mahadevan, Iravatham (Nov 30, 2003). Early Tamil Epigraphy from the Earliest Times to the Sixth Century A.D. Department of Sanskrit and Indian studies. ISBN 0-674-01227-5.
