= Stone inscriptions in Sri Lanka =

Stone inscriptions in Sri Lanka form an important piece of Sri Lankan culture.Over 4000 stone inscriptions have been found, including cave Inscriptions, rock Inscriptions (Giri lipi), slab Inscriptions (Puwaru lipi), and pile inscriptions (Tam lipi).

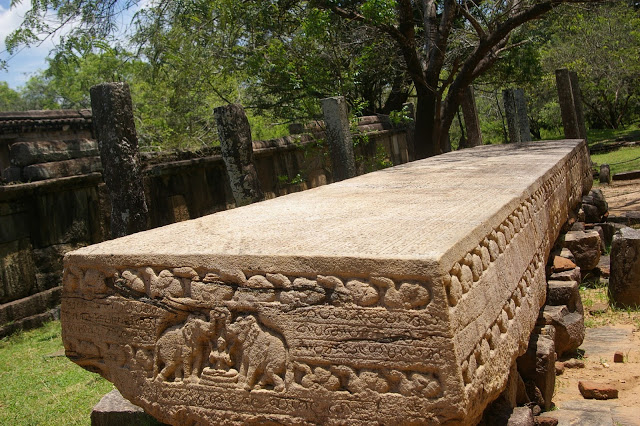
Galpotha inscription

== Distribution ==
Cave inscriptions can be found in Mihintale, Wessagiriya, Sithulpawwa, and Ritigala.

Examples for rock inscriptions are the Galwala inscription, the bilingual inscription found in Gadaladeniya and the Alawala inscription.
Polonnaruwa galpotha, Mihintale, and Thonigala examples of slab inscriptions.

Badulla and Katugahagalge are classified as pillar inscriptions.

Cave inscriptions are the oldest type. They appear below the drip ledge (katarama) of caves. These are seen in almost every cave from the early period (20th-century AC). At the beginning, the inscriptions had two or three short lines containing information about donations made to bhikkus. After the 2nd century AC, according to the Mihintale inscription, Jethavanaramaya Sanskrit inscription and Badulla pillar inscription, the inscriptions included lengthy descriptions. The inscription on the Abhayagiri terrace has 16 long lines. The inscription on the terrace of Dakunu Vihara covers 17 slabs. Some inscriptions were produced in multiple copies. Thirteen copies of the Vevalkatiya inscription of Udaya IV were placed in various parts of the Rajarata. After the 10th century A.C these have become more descriptive because they contained appreciations made for some kings.
Some of the uses of these inscriptions are to learn about:

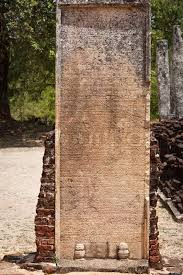
A pillar inscription

- gaps in historic facts
- evidence for historic facts
- information not present in books
- methods of controlling the temples
- methods of administration
- social traditions and customs
- the economy of ancient Sri Lanka
- the evolution of the language and the letters
- other cultural records
- different symbols used for different purposes
- Sinhala grammar
- the names of kings, rural kings and princes
- the designations of royal officers
- trade and industries in ancient country
- religious activities and other religious beliefs

== Evolution ==
At the beginning the inscriptions had two or three short lines containing information about donations made to bhikkhus. But after the 2nd century A.C, according to the Mihintale inscription, Jethavanaramaya Sanskrit inscription and Badulla pillar inscription the inscriptions included lengthy descriptions. The inscription on Abhayagiri terrace has 16 long lines. The inscription on the terrace of Dakunu Vihara spreads across on 17 slabs. Some inscriptions were produced in multiple copies. Thirteen copies of the Vevalkatiya inscription of Udaya IV were placed in various parts of the Rajarata. After the 10th century A.C these became more descriptive, containing appreciations for some kings.

Some inscriptions were written in different languages. Brahmi letters, Pali and Sanskrit were used to write some inscriptions. From these inscriptions the evolution of the Sinhala letters and the development of words, grammar, and structure can be learned.

== Donors ==
"දෙවනපිය මහ රක්ඛභ බරියය බකි(නිය) උපසික වරුණ(දත)ය(ලෙ)(ෙ)ණ"-The cave of Waruna Datta Upasika the sister of the queen of King Devanampiyatissa
"බඩගරික පරුමක කිස පුත පරුමක අශඩ ශුතඟ ලෙණෙ"-The cave of Ashanda gutta

These caves say the names of the people who made and donated the caves to the bhikkhus for their use. These people knew the donor and his/her title, genealogy, profession, and status. Donation was not limited to kings and royalty, but included people of different classes. These forms of inscriptions written in pre-and-post-Brahmi letters have been found in places such as Rajagirikanda and Aanaikkuttikanda.

== Economy ==
A single inscription can yield information on many different subjects, including the economy of ancient Sri Lanka. Trade methods, people's occupations and economic status, ownership of lands, and types of taxes can be found from them. For example, Godawaya pillar inscription describes the taxes levied in the Godapawatha Harbour, Badulla Pillar Inscription discusses the administration of an old market and Perimiyankulam inscription provides information about old trade grades and industries.

== Society ==
Stone inscriptions give facts about the spread of Buddhism, the spread of civilization, and the spread of stone inscriptions. Moreover, they describe the kings' power over the country. Inscriptions reveal information that is not written in literary sources. For example, Kaduruwewa inscription describes five generations of ministers. Inscriptions provide information about bhikkhus, various religious beliefs and customs, administration of the temples, the lands owned by the temples and privileges. The Mihintale pillar inscription, Abayagiriya Sanskrit inscription and Kaludiya pokuna inscription discuss the administration of the temples and Sithulpawwa inscription relates how the income gained by the judiciary was given to the temples.

The information contained in these inscriptions are contemporary to a particular incident. Therefore, the information written in the literary sources can be validated against the inscriptions.
