= Sithulpawwa Rajamaha Viharaya =

Ancient Buddhist monastery in Sri Lanka

- සිතුල්පව්ව රජ මහා විහාරය
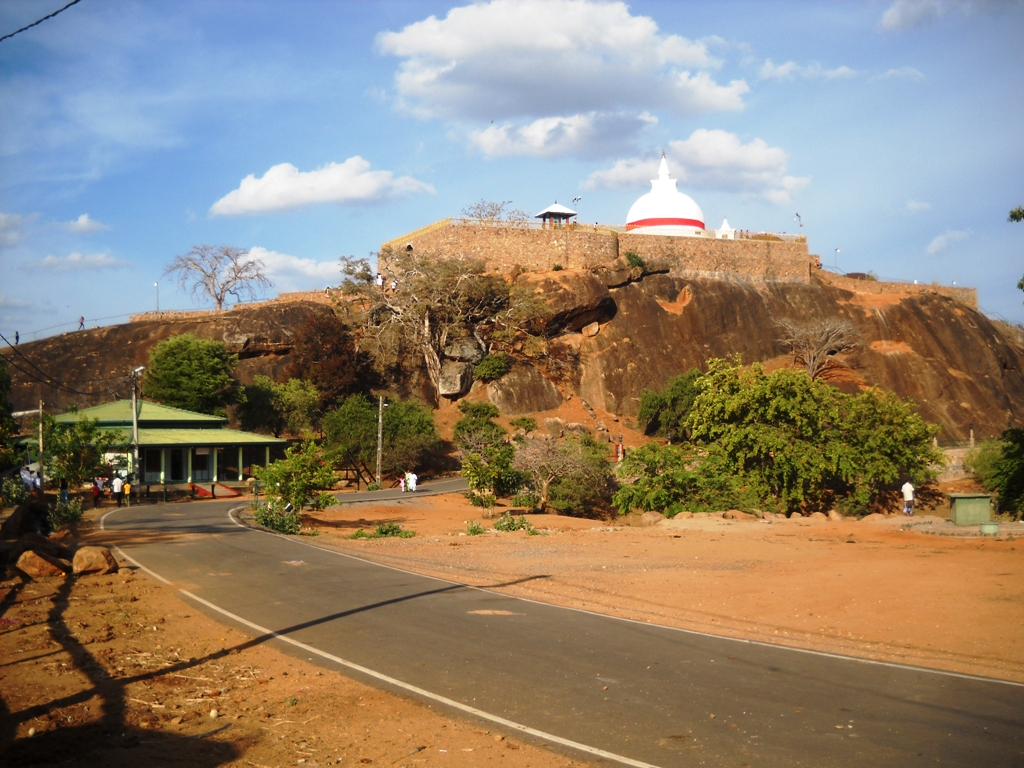
- Sithulpawwa Stupa on top of the rock.

Religion
- Affiliation: Buddhism
- District: Hambantota
- Province: Southern Province

Location
- Country: Sri Lanka
- Interactive map of Sithulpawwa Rajamaha Viharaya
- Coordinates: 6°23′13″N 81°26′59″E

Architecture
- Founder: King Kavan Tissa of Ruhuna
- Completed: Around 2nd century BC

Sithulpawwa Rajamaha Viharaya is an ancient Buddhist monastery located in Hambantota District, South Eastern Sri Lanka. Situated 18 km east of the pilgrimage town Katharagama, it is believed to have been built in the 2nd century B.C by king Kavantissa. Sithulpawwa Vihara can be reached by travelling 18 miles along the Tissamaharama-Yodhakandiya road towards the Yala National Park. The name Sithulpawwa is derived from the word "Chiththala Pabbatha", which means "the hill of the quiet mind".

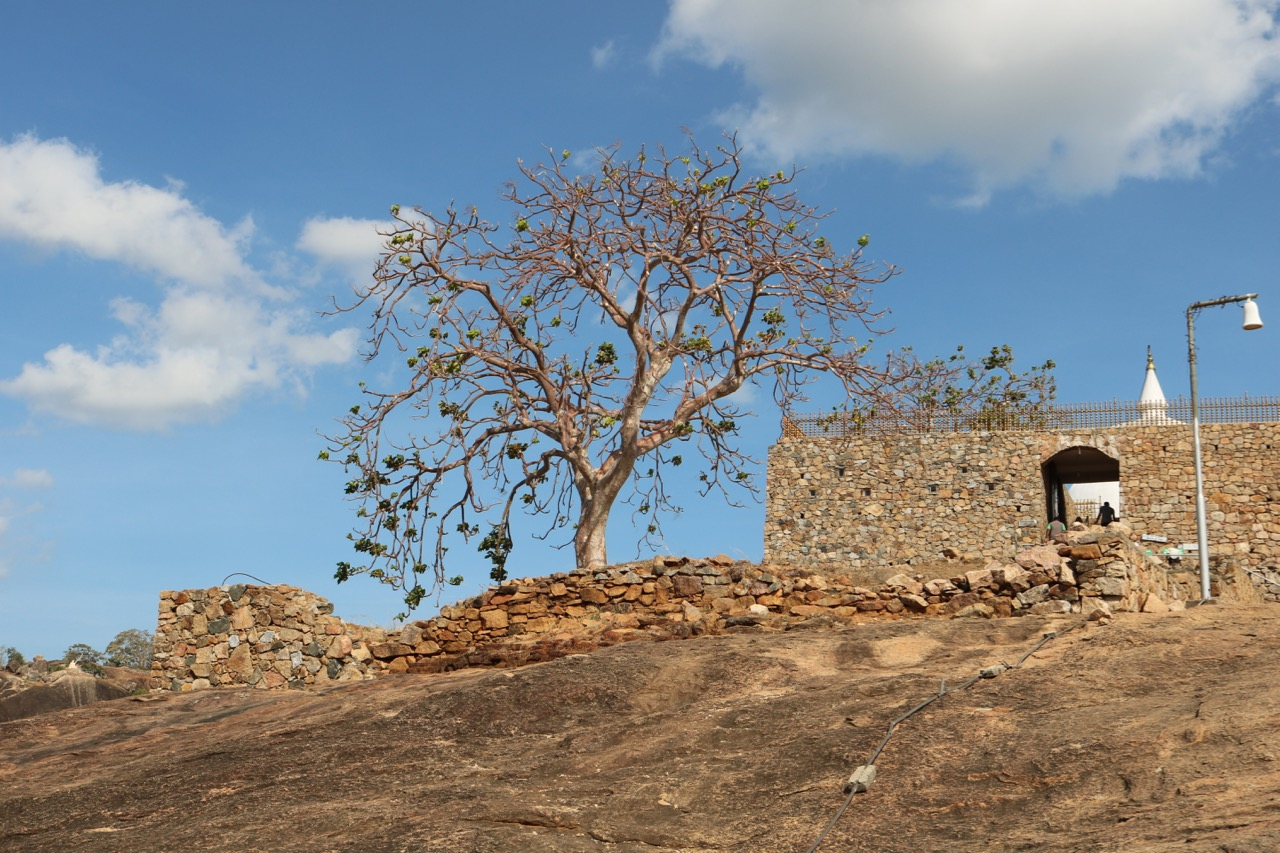
Sithulpawwa temple

This monastery was a place of worship for devotees as well as a center of Buddhist education for Buddhist monks. Paintings of the Anuradhapura era and the ruins of stone Buddha images, Bodhisattva images, Image Houses, Circular Relic Houses are spread throughout the monastery premises. The present chief incumbent of Sithulpawwa Rajamaha Vihara is Ven. Metaramba Hemarathana Nayake Thera. King Gajabahu placed a stone inscription where it states that the tax received from the court must be paid to the monks of this monastery.

== See also ==
- Thissamaharama Viharaya
- Yatala Vehera
