= Sorabora Wewa =

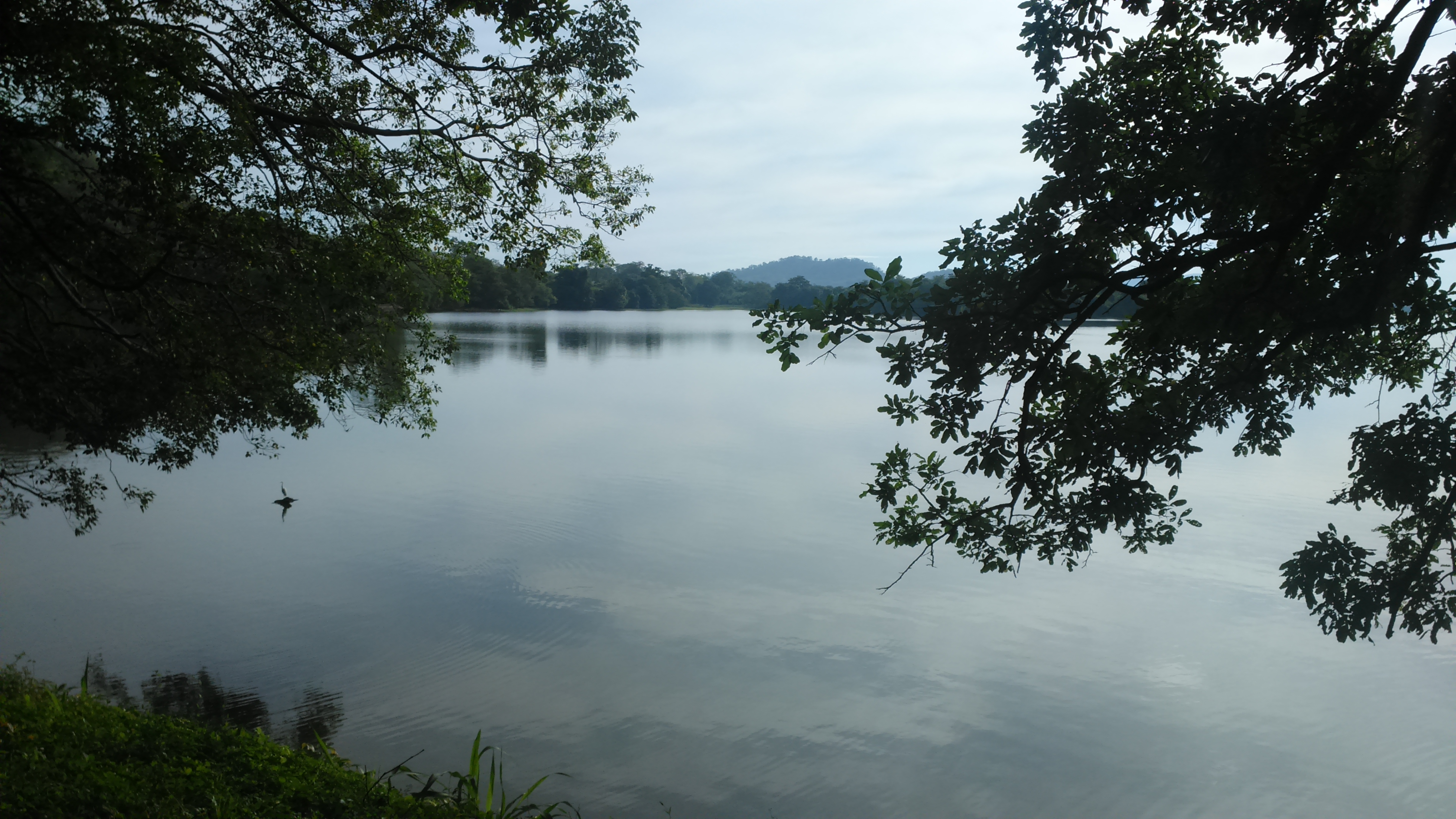

- Location within Sri Lanka
- Location: Mahiyangana
- Coordinates: 7°21′38.9″N 81°00′21.9″E
- Type: Irrigation Reservoir
- Basin countries: Sri Lanka
- Surface area: 4.5 km^{2} (1.7 sq mi)
- Water volume: 14.6 million cubic metres (11,800 acre⋅ft)

Sorabora Wewa (Sinhalese: සොරබොර වැව) is an ancient reservoir in Mahiyangana, Badulla District Sri Lanka. It is thought to have been constructed during the reign of King Dutugemunu (161 BC – 137 BC) by a giant named Bulatha. In the ancient past, this tank was known as the 'Sea of Bintenna'.

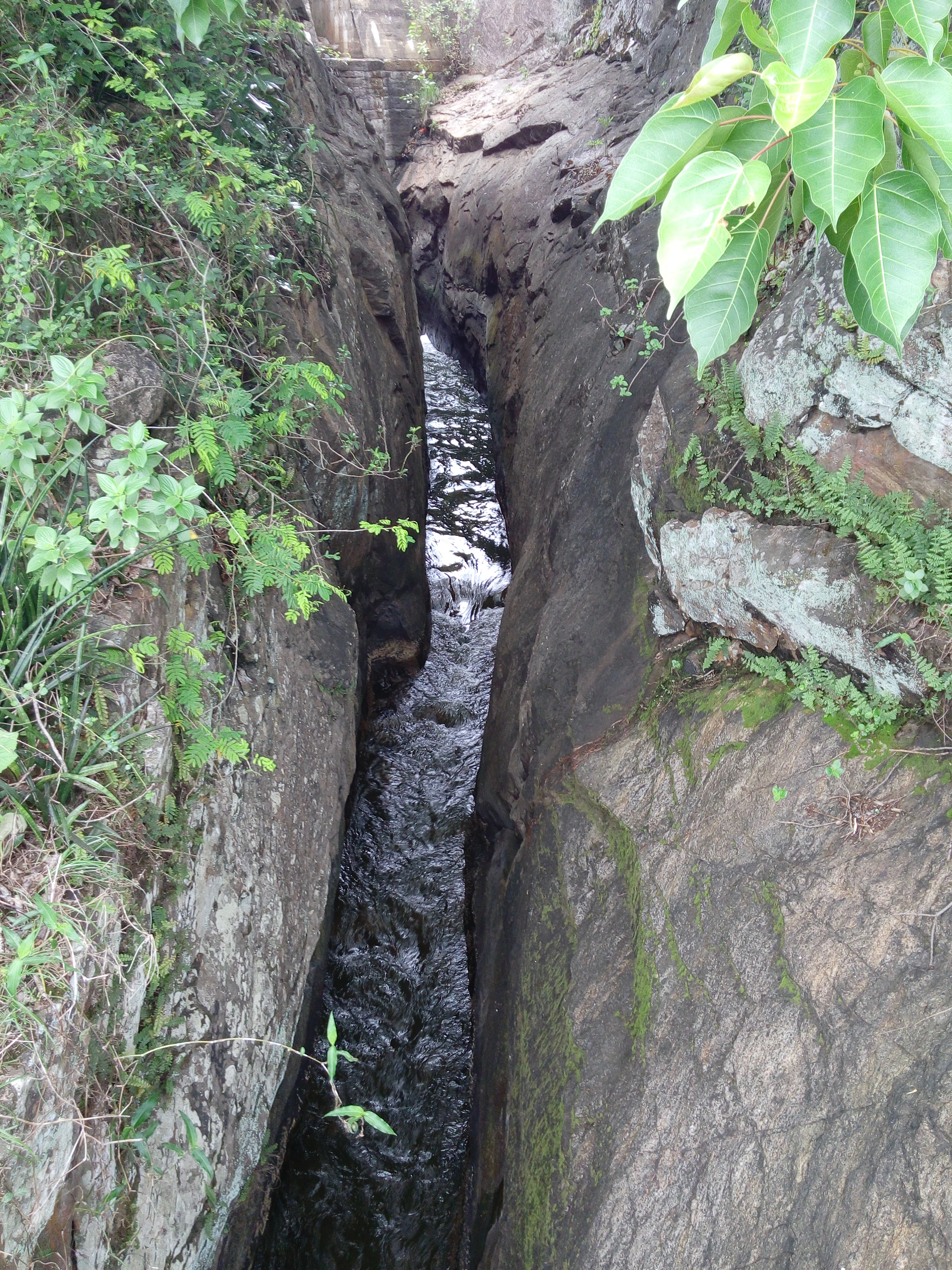
This canal cut deep into the rock acts as the sluice for the tank. Currently the tank and the ancient structure have been declared as archaeological protected monuments.

The tank was built by damming the Diyawanna Oya with a 485-meter embankment. It does not make use of the structure called Bisokotuwa, which helps to regulate water pressure at the sluice gates from inside the tank and protect the embankment from erosion. Instead that the sluice gate (Sorowwa) of the tank has been placed strategically away from the embankment and made up utilizing the massive natural rock around the tank. It is said that this is the only such type sluice gate found in Sri Lanka.

== See also ==
- Badulla Pillar Inscription
- List of Archaeological Protected Monuments in Badulla District
