= Badulla Pillar Inscription =

Coordinates: 6°59′23″N 81°03′28″E

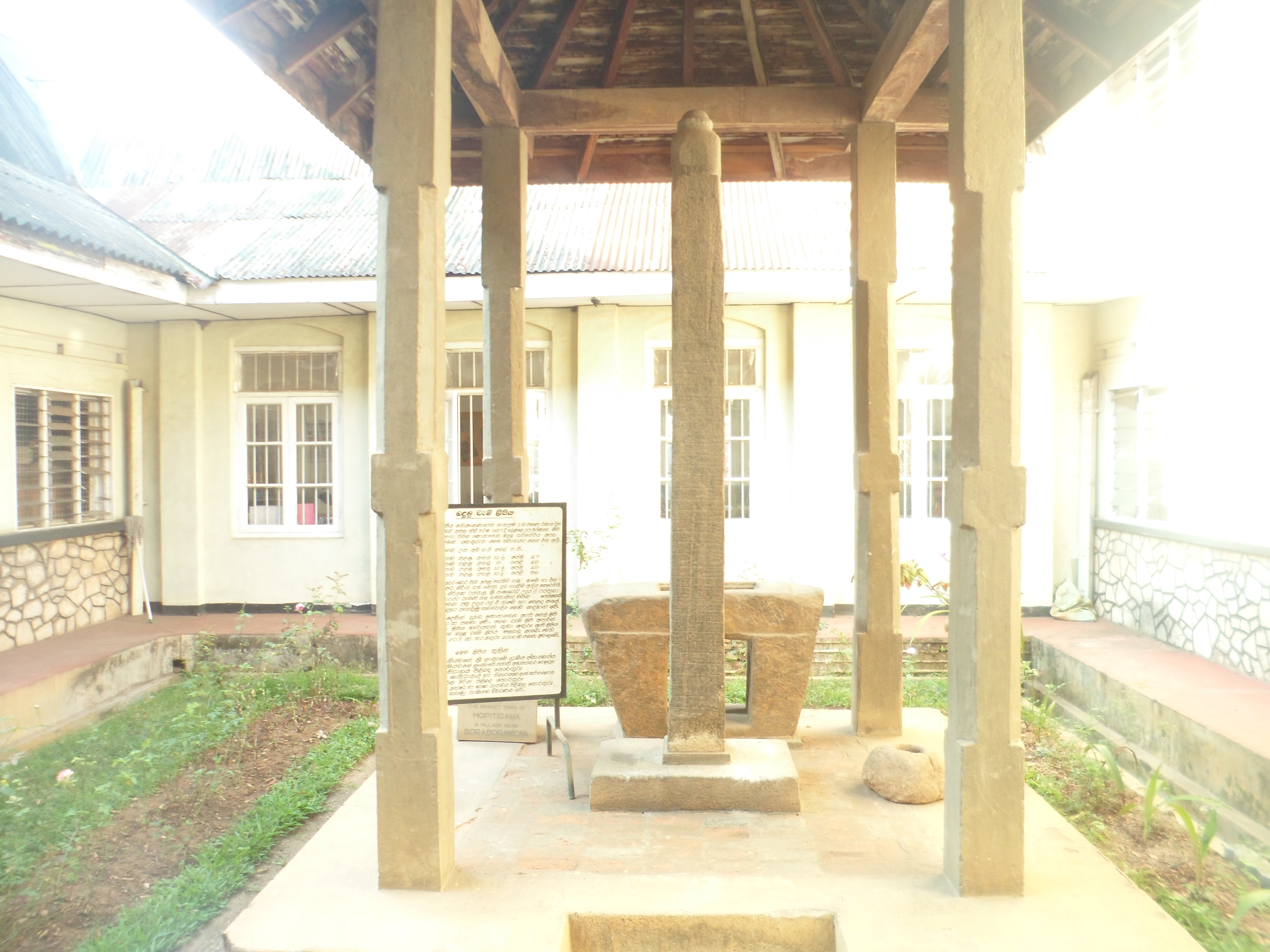
- Material: Stone
- Writing: Medieval Sinhala
- Discovered: 1857; Close to the Sorabora Wewa
- Discovered by: John Bailey
- Present location: Senarath Paranavithana Memorial Library at Badulla

Badulla Pillar Inscription (Sinhala: බදුලු ටැම් ලිපිය) is an archaeological stone inscription, which is currently located at the Senarath Paranavithana Memorial Library of Badulla, Sri Lanka. The inscription is engraved on a rock surface, with the height of 2.43 m (8.0 ft) and 127 mm (5.0 in). It contains 203 lines and about 2,000 aksharas (characters). The Badulla inscription is considered to be the largest pillar inscription, with the smallest letters, found in the country.

== Content ==
The pillar inscription was created during the reign of King Udaya IV. It was recorded that the trade had been practised in the market town of Hopitigama. According to the inscription, the traders and the householders of Hopitigama had submitted a petition outlining corruption and bribes done by the village chief, to King Udaya when he visited the Mahiyangana pagoda. After a probe, the stone pillar was erected on the orders of the king, which published the rules prohibiting these illegal activities.

Additionally, the inscription reveals that in those days scales had been used to measure grain and bulls had been used for the transportation of goods.

== Location ==
The Badulla Pillar Inscription was found in 1857 by Jone Belli, the British deputy agent for Badulla. It was discovered about 4.8 km (3.0 mi) to the north-east of the Mahiyangana pagoda and close to the Sorabora Wewa area. Initially it was placed at the Kachcheri in Badulla, but due to concerns about its conservation the pillar inscription was relocated to its current position at the Badulla public library.

== See also ==
- Stone inscriptions in Sri Lanka
