= Tissa Wewa (Tissamaharama) =

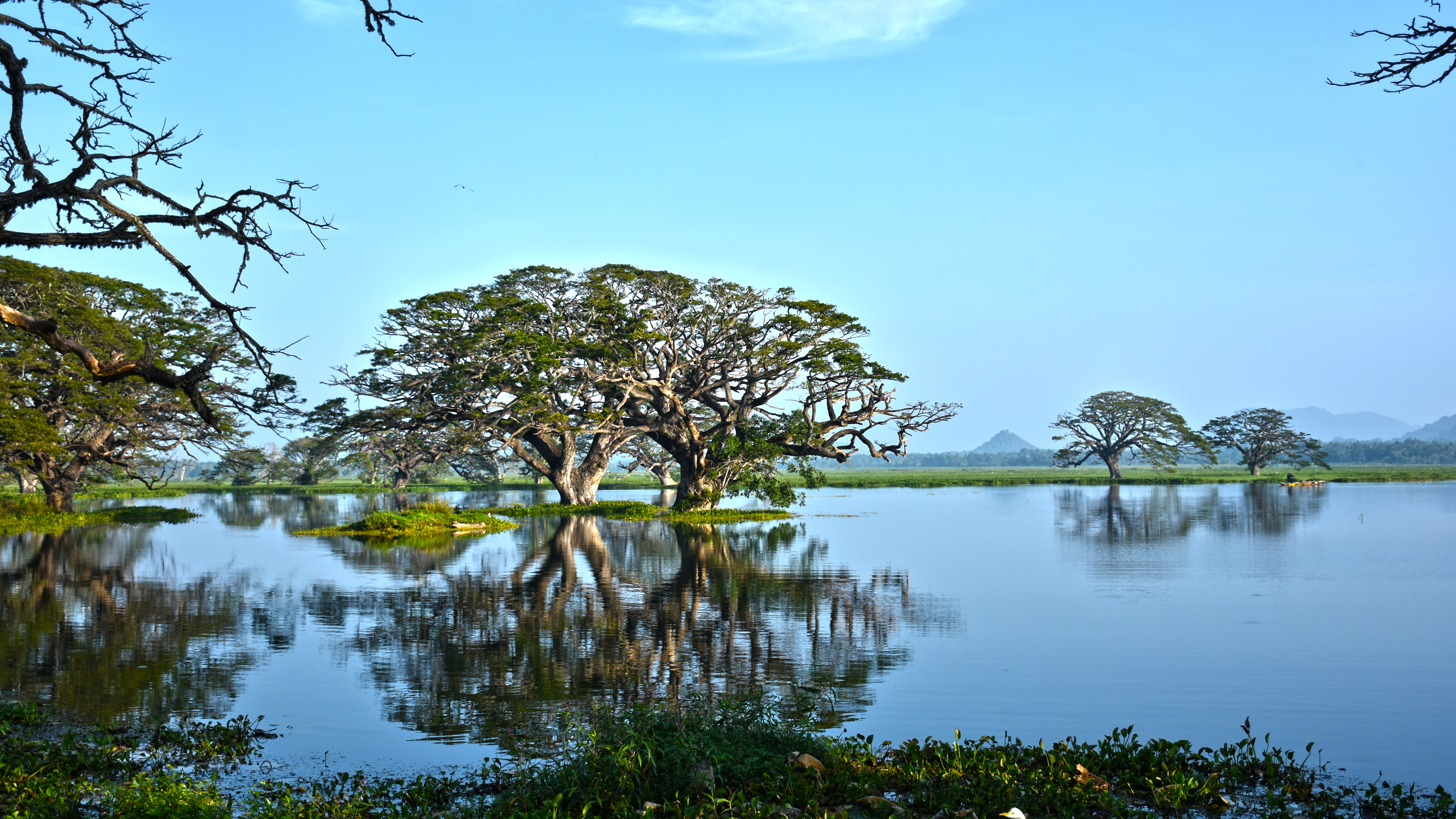
- View of Tissa Wewa

- Location within Sri Lanka
- Location: Tissamaharama
- Coordinates: 6°17′N 81°17′E
- Type: Reservoir
- Basin countries: Sri Lanka
- Surface area: 652 acres (264 ha)
- Average depth: 13 ft (4.0 m)

Tissa Wewa is a reservoir in Tissamaharama, Sri Lanka, thought to have been constructed in the 3rd century BC, either by Mahanaga of Ruhuna or his successor Yatala Tissa of Ruhuna, in order to irrigate paddy lands and supply water to the flourishing city of Tissamaharama.

The lake was restored in 1871. The embankment (or bund) on the southern shore supports the Tissa-Kataragama road (B464), which is lined by old Indian rain trees planted by the British to provide shade.

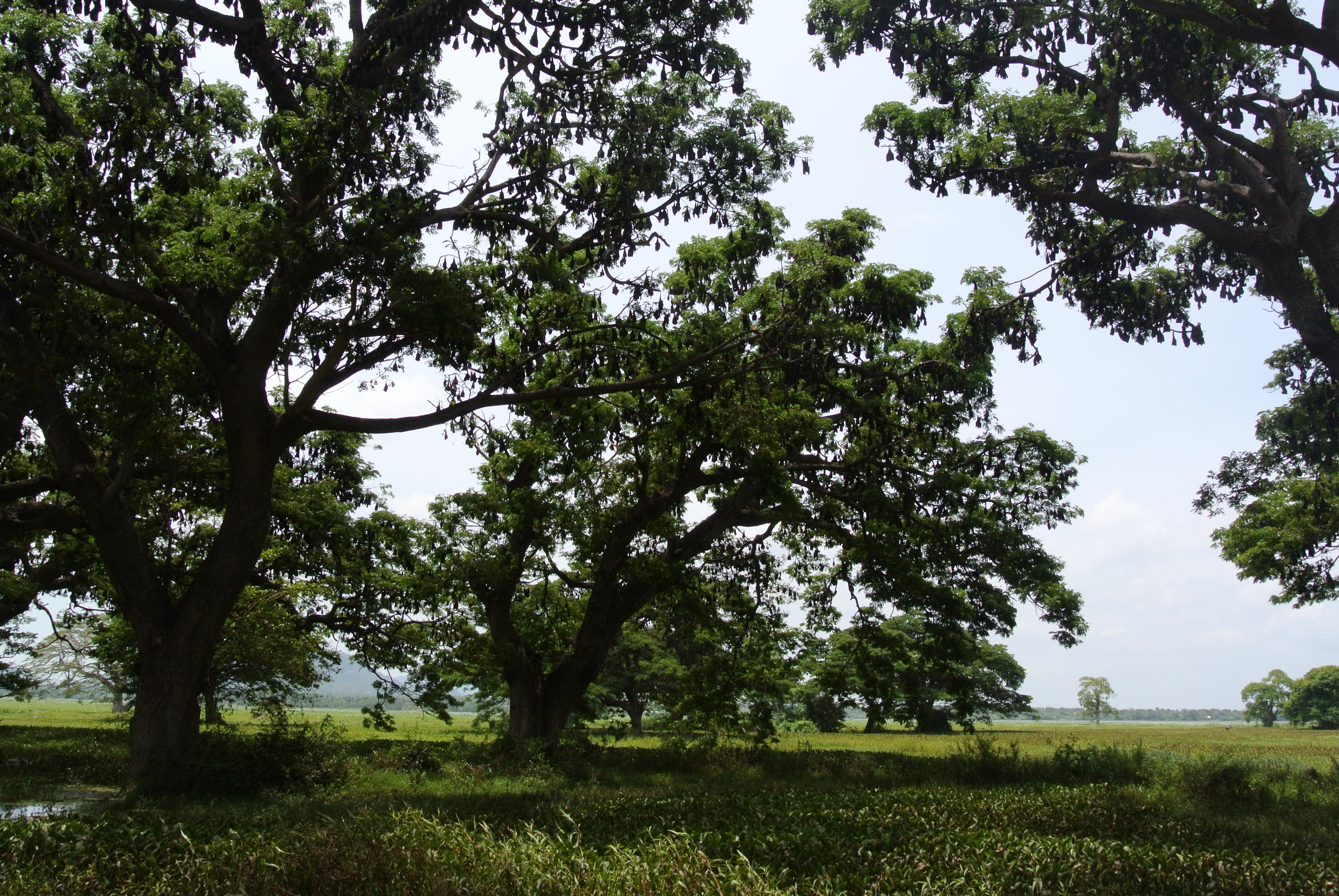
Bats on the western side of Tissa Wewa

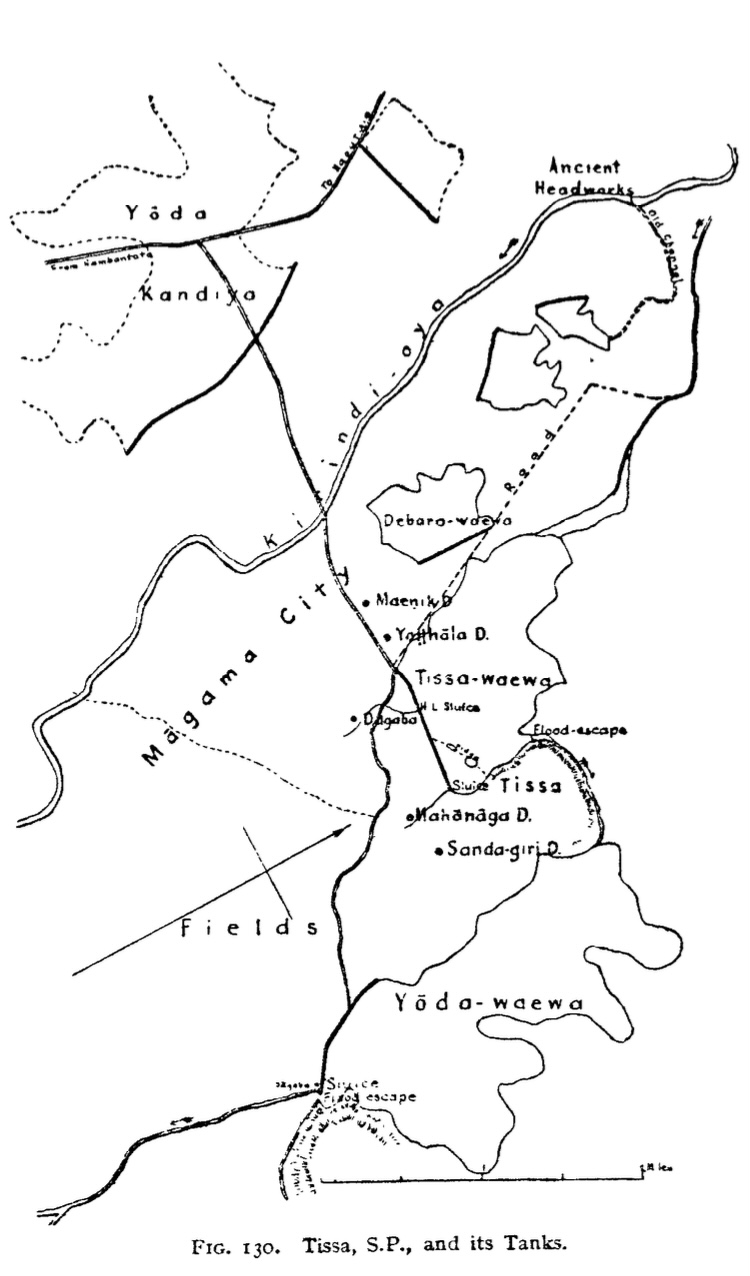
Diagram of Tissa Wewa system from Ancient Ceylon (1909)
