= Paschimottanasana =

Asana in yoga

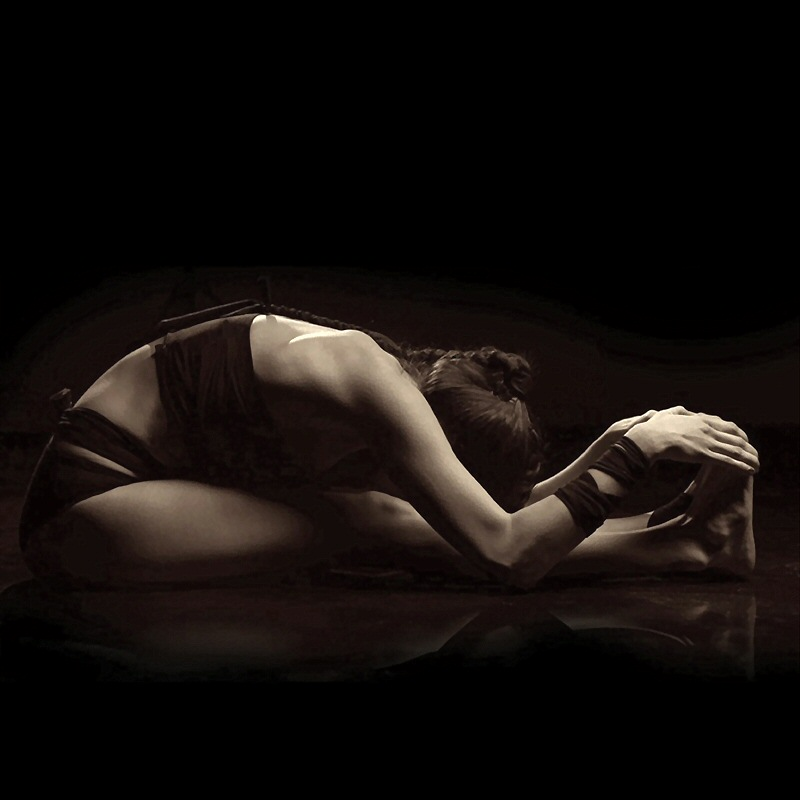
Pashchimottanasana

Pashchimottanasana (Sanskrit: पश्चिमोत्तानासन, romanized: paścimottānāsana), Seated Forward Bend, or Intense Dorsal Stretch is a seated forward-bending asana in hatha yoga and modern yoga as exercise. Janusirsasana is a variant with one knee bent out to the side; Upavishthakonasana has the legs straight and wide apart.

== Etymology and origins ==
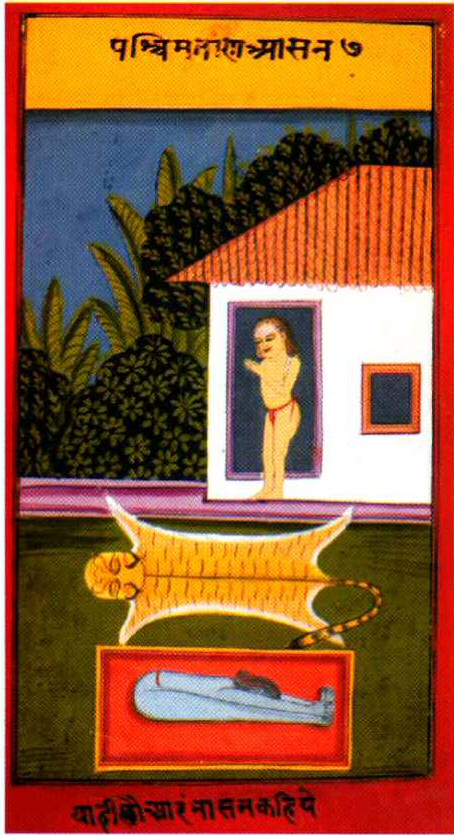
Paschimottanasana illustrated in an 1830 manuscript of the Jogapradipika

The name Paschimottanasana comes from three Sanskrit words. Paschima (पश्चिम, paścima) has the surface meaning of "West" or "the back of the body". In terms of the subtle body (as in the Yogabīja), it means the central energy channel, the sushumna nadi, which runs the length of the backbone. Uttana (उत्तान, uttāna) means "intense stretch" or "straight" or "extended". Asana (आसन, āsana) meaning "posture" or "seat". The pose is described in the 15th-century Hatha Yoga Pradipika, chapter 1, verses 28-29.

The name Dandasana (Sanskrit: दण्डासन; IAST: daṇḍāsana) is from Sanskrit दण्ड daṇḍa meaning "stick" or "staff". The pose is not found in the medieval hatha yoga texts. The 19th century Sritattvanidhi uses the name Dandasana for a different pose, the body held straight, supported by a rope. The yoga scholar Norman Sjoman notes, however, that the traditional Indian Vyayama gymnastic exercises include a set of movements called "dands", similar to Surya Namaskar and to the vinyasas used in modern yoga.

The name Janusirsasana (Sanskrit: जानु शीर्षासन; IAST: jānu śīrṣāsana) comes from the Sanskrit जानु (jānu) meaning "knee" and शीर्ष (śīrṣa) meaning "head". The pose is a modern one, first seen in the 20th century. It is described in Krishnamacharya's 1934 Yoga Makaranda, and in the works of his pupils, B. K. S. Iyengar's 1966 Light on Yoga and Pattabhi Jois's Ashtanga Vinyasa Yoga.

The name Upavishthakonasana (Sanskrit: उपविष्टकोणासन); IAST: upaviṣṭa koṇāsana) is from the Sanskrit उपविष्ट (upaviṣṭa) meaning "open" and कोण (koṇa) meaning "angle". It is not found in medieval hatha yoga, but is described in Light on Yoga. It is independently described under a different name, Hastapadasana ("Hand-to-Foot Pose" (Note: Hastapadasana is otherwise a synonym of the standing Forward Bend, uttanasana.)) in Swami Vishnudevananda's 1960 Complete Illustrated Book of Yoga, suggesting an older origin.

== Description ==
Paschimottanasana is entered from Dandasana (seated Staff pose) by bending forward from the hips without straining and grasping the feet or lower legs. A strap may be placed around the feet and grasped in the hands if the back is stiff. The head may be rested on a folded blanket or bolster, which may be raised on a small stool if necessary. People who have difficulty bending their backs should exercise caution when performing this asana.

== Variations ==
Dandasana or "Staff pose" has the legs extended along the floor and the body straight upright, with the palms or fingertips on the ground. People who cannot sit on the floor like this can sit on a folded blanket.

Janusirsasana or "Head to knee pose" has one leg extended with toes pointing upward, and the other leg bent with knee pointing away from the straight leg and the sole of the foot in by the groin. The torso folds straight forwards over the extended leg.

Urdhva Mukha Paschimottanasana, also called Ubhaya Padangusthasana, is a balancing form of the pose, legs and hands pointing upwards.

Parivritta Paschimottanasana is the reversed or twisted form of the pose, the body twisted to one side and the hands reversed, so that if the body is turned to the left, the right hand grasps the left foot, the right elbow is over the left knee, and the left hand grasps the right foot.

Trianga Mukhaikapada Paschimottanasana has one leg bent as in Virasana.

Wide-Legged Forward Bend (Prone Paschimottanasana) Open your legs wider than hip-width apart and fold forward. This variation targets the inner thighs while still stretching the back.

Baddha Padma Paschimottanasana has one leg crossed over the other as in Padmasana.

Upavishthakonasana or "wide-angle seated forward bend" has both legs straight along the ground, as wide apart as possible, with the chin and nose touching the ground. Parsva Upavishthakonasana (to the side) has the body facing one leg, and the hands both grasping the foot of that leg, without raising the opposite hip. Urdhva Upavishthakonasana (upwards) is similar to Navasana but with legs wide. It has the first and second fingers grasping the big toes, the legs wide apart, straight, and raised to around head height; the body is tilted back slightly to balance on the sitting bones. The pose can be practised with a strap around each foot if the legs cannot be straightened fully in the position; a rolled blanked can be placed behind the buttocks to assist with balancing. If you have a back injury, a knee injury, or high blood pressure, avoid this asana.

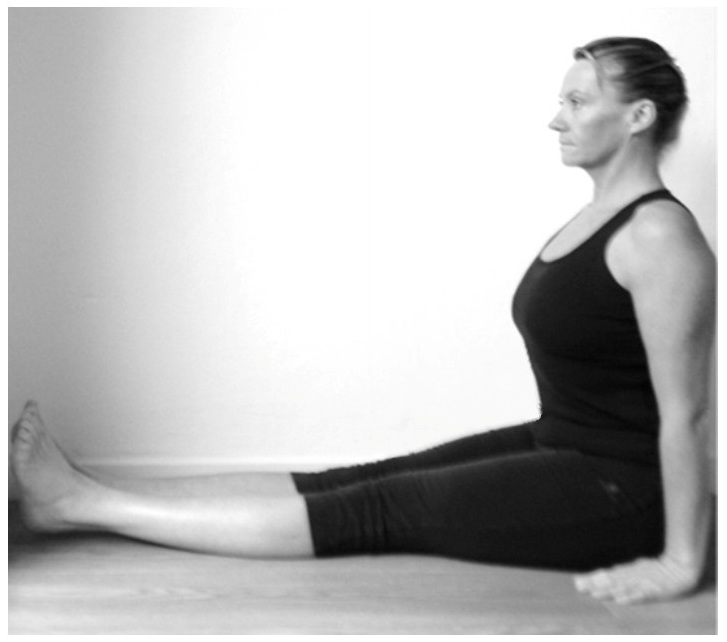
Dandasana

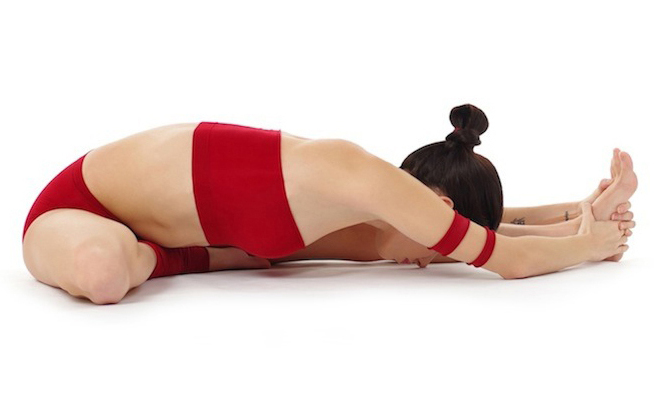
Janusirsasana

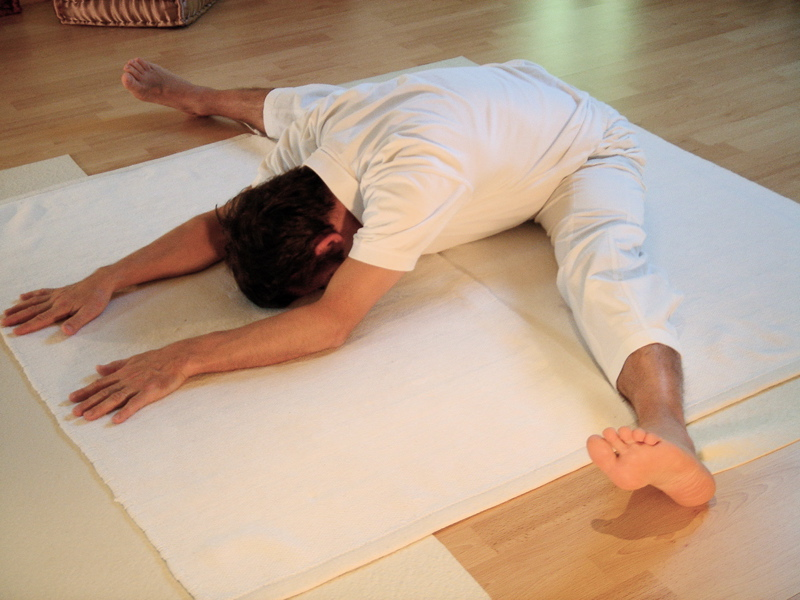
Upavishthakonasana

== Effects ==
This asana is said to carry air to the susumna channel.

== See also ==
- Uttanasana, a standing forward bend
- Mahamudra

== Sources ==
- Iyengar, B. K. S. (1991) [1966]. Light on Yoga. Thorsons. pp. 166–170. ISBN 978-1855381667.
- Mehta, Silva; Mehta, Mira; Mehta, Shyam (1990). Yoga: The Iyengar Way. Dorling Kindersley. ISBN 978-0863184208.
- Sjoman, Norman E. (1999) [1996]. The Yoga Tradition of the Mysore Palace. Abhinav Publications. ISBN 81-7017-389-2.
