= Uttanasana =

Standing forward-bending posture in modern yoga

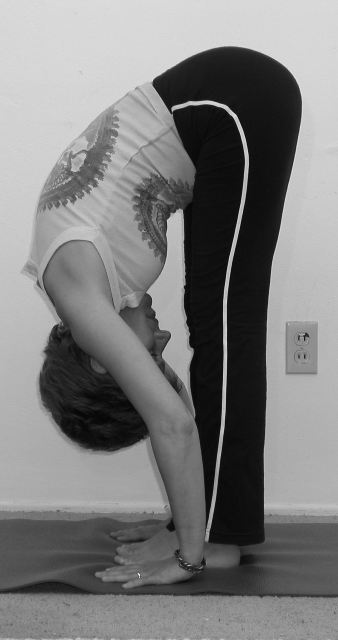
Uttanasana

Uttanasana (Sanskrit: उत्तानासन; IAST: uttānāsana) or Standing Forward Bend, with variants such as Padahastasana where the toes are grasped, is a standing forward bending asana in modern yoga as exercise.

== Etymology and origins ==
The name comes from the Sanskrit words उत्तान uttāna, "intense stretch"; and आसन; uāsana, "posture" or "seat".

The pose is a modern one, first seen in the 20th century. A pose with the name Uttānāsana is illustrated in the 19th century Sritattvanidhi but it is quite different from the modern pose (lying on the back, with elbows touching the knees and the hands behind the neck). The modern pose is described in Krishnamacharya's 1934 Yoga Makaranda, and in the works of his pupils, B. K. S. Iyengar's 1966 Light on Yoga and Pattabhi Jois's Ashtanga (vinyasa) yoga. Theos Bernard however illustrates the related pose "Padhahasthasana" (sic) in his 1944 report of his experience of hatha yoga on the border of India and Tibet, suggesting the existence of a separate tradition.

== Description ==
The pose is entered from the standing position of Tadasana, bending forward at the hips until the palms can be placed on the floor, ultimately behind the heels.

== Variations ==
Ardha Uttanasana is a halfway stage, the trunk horizontal and the palms resting on the calves.

Niralamba Uttanasana has the hands touching the waistband rather than reaching down.

Padahastasana has the hands under the toes and feet, palms up.

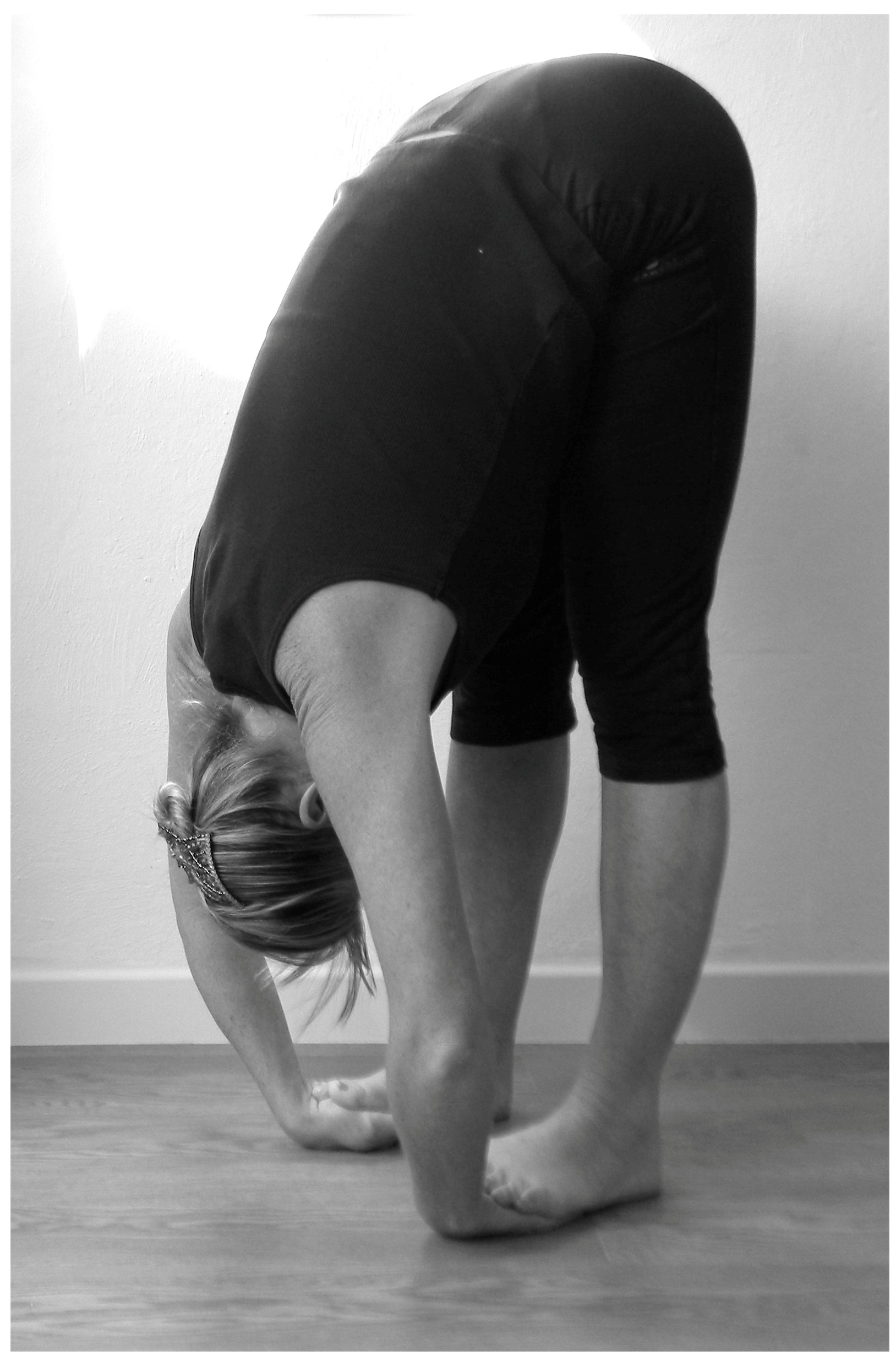
Padahastasana

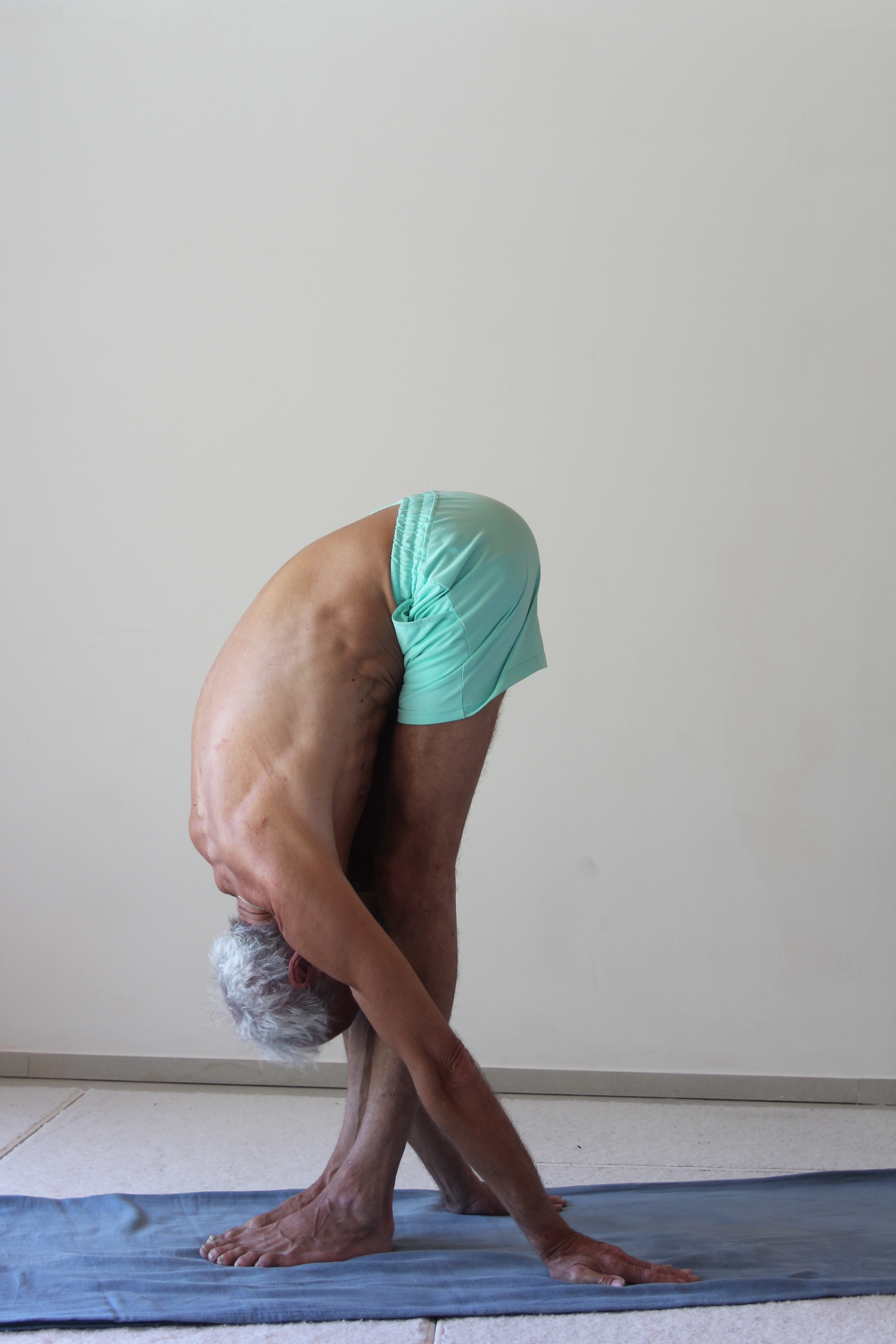
Advanced version with variant arm position

== See also ==
- Paschimottanasana, a sitting forward bend
