= Krishnamacharya: His Life and Teachings =

Book by A. G. Mohan with Ganesh Mohan

- Author: A. G. Mohan with Ganesh Mohan
- Genre: Yoga
- Publisher: Shambhala Publications
- ISBN: 978-1-59030-800-4

Krishnamacharya: His Life and Teachings is a book written by A. G. Mohan with Ganesh Mohan. This book is a tribute to "the father of modern yoga," Tirumalai Krishnamacharya (1888–1989). Krishnamacharya was a renowned Indian yoga master, ayurvedic healer, and scholar who created many of the practices of yoga as exercise, and whose students B. K. S. Iyengar, Indra Devi, K. Pattabhi Jois, and T. K. V. Desikachar dramatically popularized yoga in the West.

In this book, A. G. Mohan, a personal student of Krishnamacharya for almost two decades (1971–1989), draws on his own memories and Krishnamacharya's diaries and recorded material to present a portrait of the man and his teachings.
