= The Path of Modern Yoga =

Nonfiction book by Elliott Goldberg (2016)

- Cover of 1st edition, showing B. K. S. Iyengar in Natarajasana
- Author: Elliott Goldberg
- Subject: Modern yoga
- Genre: Social history
- Publisher: Inner Traditions
- Publication date: 2016
- Pages: 495
- OCLC: 991434887

The Path of Modern Yoga: The History of an Embodied Spiritual Practice is a 2016 history of the modern practice of postural yoga by the yoga scholar Elliott Goldberg. It focuses in detail on eleven pioneering figures of the transformation of yoga in the 20th century, including Yogendra, Kuvalayananda, Pant Pratinidhi, Krishnamacharya, B. K. S. Iyengar and Indra Devi.

The book's thesis is that modern yoga progressed in three stages from its pre-1900 state to what is observed today. Before 1900, haṭha yoga was the despised religious practice of a small minority on the fringes of Indian society. In the first stage, pioneers such as Yogendra and Kuvalayananda treated yoga as the subject of medical inquiry, making it both secular and socially acceptable. Next, advocates of exercise brought standing poses from gymnastics into yoga: Pant Pratinidhi advocated Surya Namaskar (the sun salutation), a jumped sequence of poses, as daily exercise, while Krishnamacharya incorporated those poses and others as standing asanas in his yoga, along with the jumped transitions (vinyasas) between them, making yoga dynamic. Finally, two pupils of Krishnamacharya, Iyengar and Indra Devi, resacralised yoga, connecting the practice of asanas to ancient yoga tradition, and helped to spread yoga across the Western world.

The book received mixed reviews, noting Goldberg's many years of study and the book's detailed account of yoga's transformations, but also its lack of an introduction, overview, or exploration of yoga's spiritual aspects.

== Context ==
The modern practice of yoga as a form of exercise developed from medieval haṭha yoga in the 20th century by discarding most of its practices and focussing on asanas, physical postures. At the same time, it acquired an element of aerobic exercise, initially through the adoption from physical culture of Surya Namaskar, the series of postures connected by flowing movements known as the sun salutation. In some modern styles of yoga, these flowing movements have developed into vinyasas, connecting sequences used throughout the yoga session.

== Book ==
Goldberg divides the path of modern yoga into three steps, corresponding to the three parts of the book: Medicalisation, becoming Dynamic, and Resacralisation.

=== Synopsis ===
The Path of Modern Yoga, based on what the author states is 10 years of research, examines the history of modern asana-based yoga through the lives of eleven pioneering figures: Sri Yogendra; Swami Kuvalayananda; Seetharaman Sundaram; Tirumalai Krishnamacharya; Swami Sivananda; the bodybuilder K. V. Iyer; the rajah of Aundh, Pant Pratinidhi; the journalist Louise Morgan; the diplomat Apa Pant; and two students of Krishnamacharya, his brother-in-law, B. K. S. Iyengar, and one of Iyengar's pupils, Indra Devi.

The 35 chapters are arranged in three parts that cover the transformation of yoga during the modern period. The book maps out the development of modern yoga saw the original pre-1900 hatha yoga becoming divested of its sacred trappings (Part I); the resulting secular yoga was then made dynamic, with jumped transitions (vinyasas) between postures (Part II); and this dynamic, secular yoga was then resacralised (Part III). There is no introduction or conclusion.

Part I, "Divesting Yoga of the Sacred", consists mainly of five chapters on Yogendra and five on Kuvalayananda, who pioneered the medical study of yoga, at the start of the 20th century the territory of despised vagrants, beggars, and fakirs, and in so doing helped to make yoga acceptable.

Part II, "Making Yoga Dynamic", consists mostly of three chapters on Pant Pratinidhi, an enthusiast for exercise and a powerful advocate for Surya Namaskar; three on Krishnamacharya, described as the father of modern yoga, who incorporated many standing poses from the gymnastics of popular physical culture into his teaching, alongside the jumping transitions of Surya Namaskar, creating more standing poses and the dynamic vinyasa style of yoga that he taught to his pupils including Iyengar and K. Pattabhi Jois, who went on to found yoga schools of their own; and three on Morgan.

Part III, "Making Yoga Sacred Again", has two chapters on Devi, who helped to popularise yoga in America through her celebrity pupils in Hollywood; and seven on Iyengar, who made yoga precise, in particular with his 1966 book Light on Yoga, and who helped to spread yoga across the Western world, founding institutes of Iyengar Yoga, especially in Britain and in America.

The book is illustrated with historic monochrome photographs of its protagonists and places associated with them, and a few drawings showing movements of the body and muscles affected.

== Reception ==
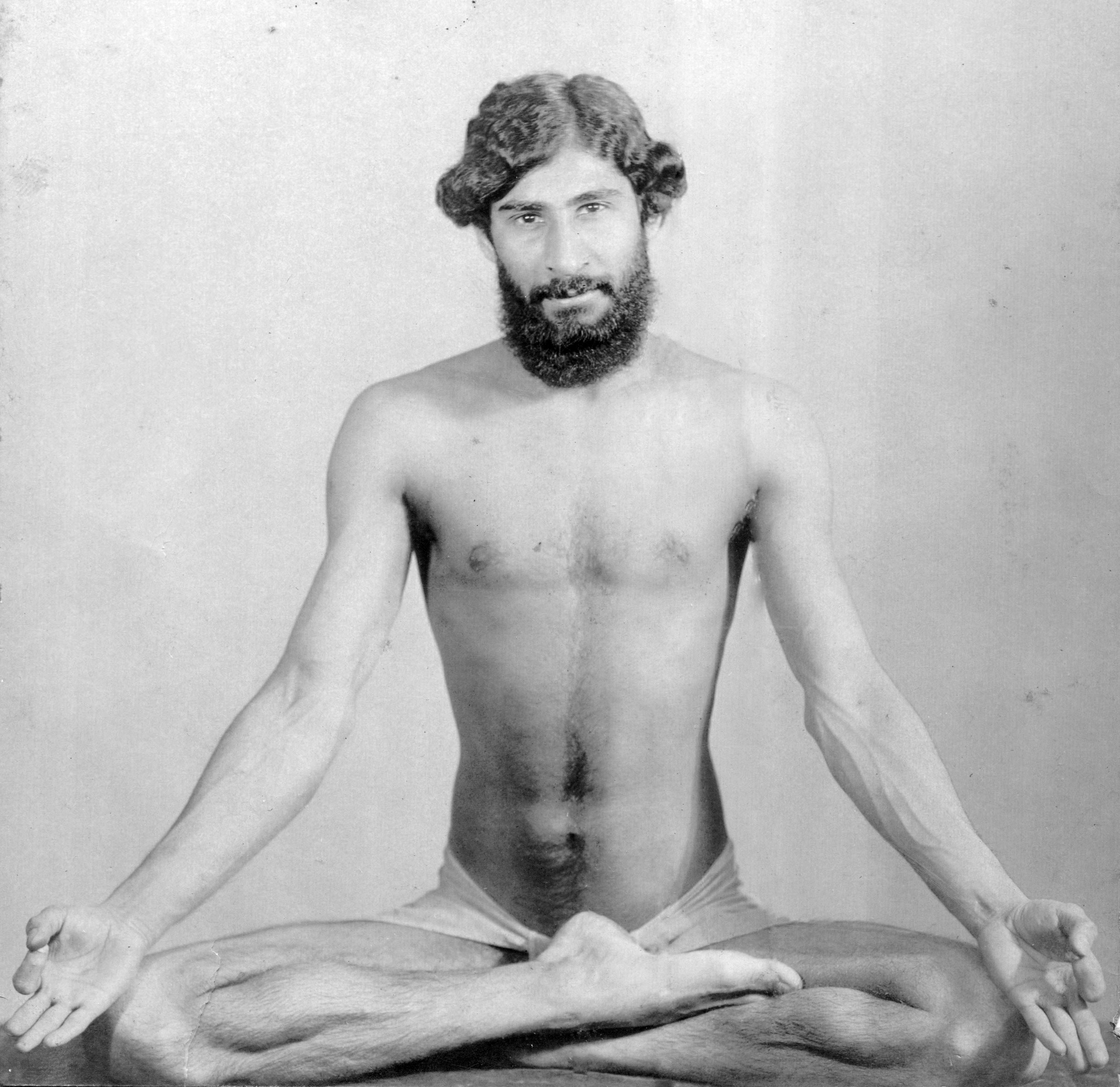
The book begins with 5 chapters on Yogendra, a pioneer of yoga as exercise.

The book received some positive reviews. Krysta Gibson, reviewing the book for New Spirit Journal, writes that the book explains "how we went from yoga being a hidden, weird thing hippies and new agers did, to yoga studios on almost very corner". In her view, Goldberg "does a masterful job" of explaining the transformation. The San Francisco Book Review likewise comments that Goldberg describes yoga's "massive transition from spiritual practice to focusing on health and fitness". The review states that Goldberg's case is that "instead of desecrating a sacred tradition, this change moved yoga from solitary and inaccessible to embodied, spiritual, and open to everyone". The trade journal Publishers Weekly calls the book "a richly detailed examination of modern yoga" and suggests that it will appeal to both practitioners and scholars.

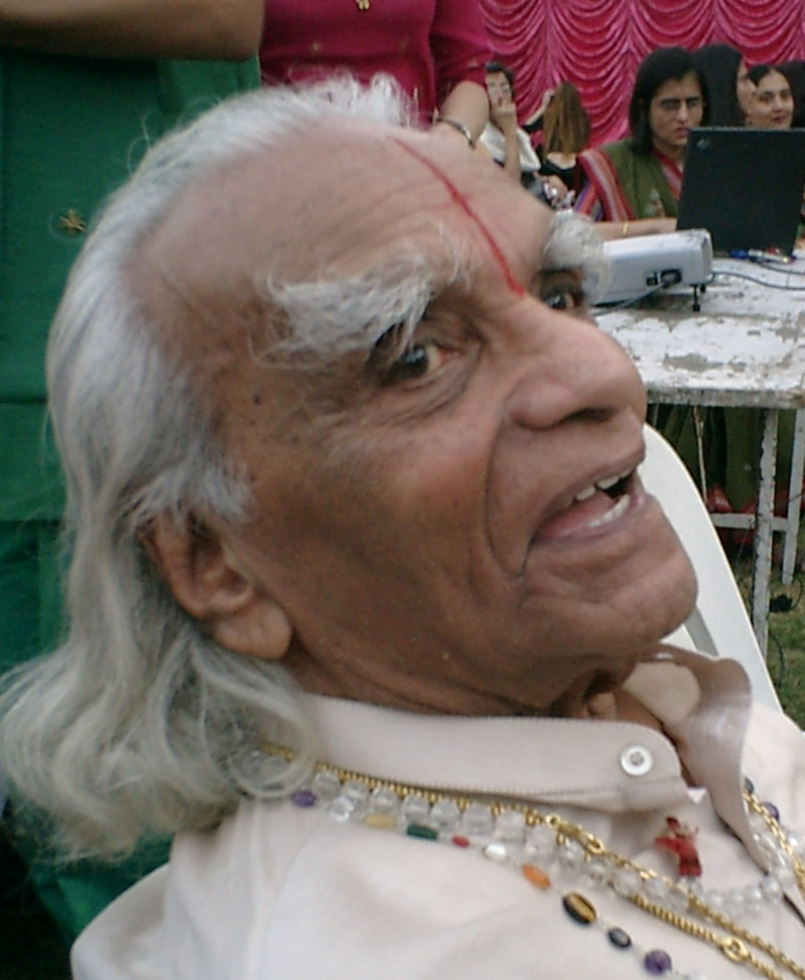
The book devotes 7 of its 35 chapters to the yoga guru B. K. S. Iyengar.

Niki Whiting, writing in Spiral Nature Magazine, was more doubtful. She comments that while she admired the research behind it, she struggled with the book, as it isn't an overview of the tradition and poses, nor a history of yoga's changes in the past 40 years, but "a specific history of yoga in the 20th century". She regretted the lack of an Introduction section in the book, and had been hoping for what she thought the subtitle suggested, a more spiritual or theological exploration.

The author and yoga teacher Matthew Remski compares historians of yoga to the fable of the blind men describing an elephant (one finds it flexible and leathery, another like a massive pillar, a third like a rope, a fourth smooth, polished, and cold...): Norman Sjoman (Note: Norman Sjoman wrote The Yoga Tradition of the Mysore Palace in 1996.) found yoga influenced by South Indian wrestling exercises; Joseph Alter (Note: Joseph Alter wrote Yoga in Modern India: The Body between Science and Philosophy in History of Religions in 2004.) found it torn between esoteric and scientific; Mark Singleton (Note: Mark Singleton wrote Yoga Body: the origins of modern posture practice in 2010.) discovered a collision of Western physical culture with Indian spirituality. In Remski's view, along comes "Goldberg with a dozen years of dogged research, a sleuthing style metered out in engaging chunks, a deep appreciation for the embodied sensations offered by competing visions of asana practice, a sharp eye for human foibles and historical oddities" and "makes a bold attempt to ride the elephant. As blindfolded as everyone else, he wobbles a bit, but hangs on for long enough to produce something that a lot of people have been waiting for: a penetrating, body-aware cultural history of a modern spirituality, written through richly realized characters." What Remski says he misses in Goldberg's book is answers to questions like what Indian physical yoga was before the transformation.

== See also ==
- Yoga Body, Mark Singleton's 2010 book on the origins of global yoga in physical culture
- Selling Yoga, Andrea Jain's 2015 book on the commercialisation of global yoga
- The Subtle Body, Stefanie Syman's 2010 book on the history of yoga in America

== Sources ==
- Goldberg, Elliott (2016). The Path of Modern Yoga : the history of an embodied spiritual practice. Rochester, Vermont: Inner Traditions. ISBN 978-1-62055-567-5. OCLC 926062252.
