= Srivatsa Ramaswami =

Indian yoga teacher

Srivatsa Ramaswami (born 1939) is a teacher of Vinyasa Krama yoga. He studied for 33 years under the "grandfather of modern yoga", Krishnamacharya. In India he teaches at Kalakshetra. He has run workshops in America at the Esalen Institute, the Himalayan Institute and many other centres. He is the author of four books on yoga.

== Life ==
Srivatsa Ramaswami was born in Palayamcottai, Tirunelveli Dt in 1939 into a religious family that practised ritual and chanting, following the Vedanta philosophy. He was schooled at the Ramakrishna Mission. His father was a personal friend of Krishnamacharya, "the father of modern yoga". He studied yoga in Madras under Krishnamacharya for 33 years from 1955. In India he taught for over 20 years at the Kalakshetra Foundation and other places, becoming well known on Indian radio and television. He has run workshops in America at the Esalen Institute, the Himalayan Institute and many other centres. He lives and teaches in America. In Britain, he has taught programs on topics such as Vinyasa Krama Yoga, the yoga of Krishnamacharya, Pranayama Mantra and Meditation, Surya Namaskar (salute to the sun); and on Hindu scriptures including the Hatha Yoga Pradipika, the Yoga Sutras of Patanjali, and the Bhagavad Gita. He is a registered yoga teacher with the Yoga Alliance.

He is married to the gynaecologist Dr. Uma Ramaswami.

== Opinion of Krishnamacharya's methods ==
Singleton notes also that Krishnamacharya told Ramaswami that the "dynamic sequencing" (vriddhi or shrushtimkri) of yoga postures (asanas) was "the method of practice for youngsters", especially for groups, and suggests that this may have been the origin of the vinyasa style of yoga taken up by another of Krishnamacharya's pupils, Pattabhi Jois.

== Reception ==
Reviewing Yoga for the Three Stages of Life (2001), Yoga Chicago comment that few of Krishnamacharya's thousands of students were as "diligent" as Ramaswami, staying for 33 years. The first chapter gives a "fascinating" account of Krishnamacharya's teaching style. The rest of the first part of the book summarizes yoga theory, while the remainder of the book looks at the practice of yoga, including asanas, pranayama, bandhas, detachment, renunciation, and mental transformation. The review concludes that while the book could help a beginner with a bad back, it was mainly for "the serious student" wanting an account of "the whole yoga story".

Reviewing The Complete Book of Vinyasa Yoga (2005), Publishers Weekly notes that Ramaswami calls much Western yoga "blatantly aggressive" and lacking coverage of key aspects including pranayama, chanting, meditation, and yoga philosophy. The review notes that many of the 900 asanas and variations are highly advanced, though the sequences include some for beginners and intermediates. The review finds Ramaswami's approach "somewhat didactic", and the format like a reference manual, requiring the context provided by his earlier Yoga for the Three Stages of Life.

Sarah Mata-Gabor, reviewing Yoga Beneath the Surface (2006) for International Journal of Yoga Therapy, writes that it "illuminates the virtue of inquiry in the pursuit of a comprehensive understanding of yoga." In her view, Ramaswami "answers Hurwitz's questions with knowledge, experience, and generosity, providing a sturdy foundation for a modern Western student of Yoga." She finds his answers "non-dogmatic but authoritative", providing insights into Krishnamacharya's teaching with "an exceptional balance of objectivity and subjectivity". Sharon Steffensen, reviewing the book for Yoga Chicago, comments that it reads "like a private conversation between a disciple and a guru". She finds Ramaswami's knowledge "vast and deep"; his answers to Hurwitz's questions increased her understanding of yoga, but also made her feel "uplifted, hope-filled and inspired." Joelle Hann, reviewing the book for Timeout New York, writes that Ramaswami "illuminates issues as varied as the nature of the self, the hidden benefits of poses and whether to jump back to Chaturanga Dandasana on an inhale, exhale or no breath at all." She calls the format "skimmable", but that to understand it fully, the reader might need other books, such as Ramaswami's Complete Book of Vinyasa Yoga, and warns that the book demands some effort from readers new to Sanskrit and the Yoga Sutras.

== Works ==
- (1982) Basic Tenets of Patanjala Yoga, Cambridge Yoga Publications.
- (2001) Yoga for the Three Stages of Life: Developing Your Practice As an Art Form, a Physical Therapy, and a Guiding Philosophy, Inner Traditions. ISBN 978-0892818204
- (2005) The Complete Book of Vinyasa Yoga: The Authoritative Presentation - Based on 30 Years of Direct Study Under the Legendary Yoga Teacher Krishnamacha, Da Capo. ISBN 978-1569244029
- (2006) Yoga Beneath the Surface: An American Student and His Indian Teacher Discuss Yoga Philosophy and Practice (with David Hurwitz), Da Capo. ISBN 978-1569242940
