= Yoga Makaranda =

Hatha yoga book by Krishnamacharya

- Modern edition, the cover showing Krishnamacharya demonstrating "Yogasana Samasthiti Kramam"
- Author: Tirumalai Krishnamacharya
- Language: Kannada
- Subject: Modern yoga
- Genre: Instruction manual
- Publication date: 1934
- Publication place: India
- English publication date: 2006, 2011

Yoga Makaranda (Sanskrit: योग मकरन्द), meaning "Essence of Yoga", is a 1934 book on hatha yoga by the influential pioneer of yoga as exercise, Tirumalai Krishnamacharya. Most of the text is a description of 42 asanas accompanied by 95 photographs of Krishnamacharya and his students executing the poses. There is a brief account of practices other than asanas, which form just one of the eight limbs of classical yoga, that Krishnamacharya "did not instruct his students to practice".

The yoga scholar Mark Singleton notes that the book is almost legendary among Pattabhi Jois's students, though "very few have actually seen it". Singleton notes, too, that the book was "experimental". The yoga scholar Norman Sjoman criticises the book's "padded academic bibliography" full of irrelevant works, and the perfunctory and ill-informed coverage of yoga practices other than asanas, while another yoga scholar, Elliott Goldberg, comments that the photographs serve to demystify the asanas of their spiritual content, and that Krishnamacharya was falsely claiming an ancient origin for his dynamic vinyasa system of yoga.

== Context ==
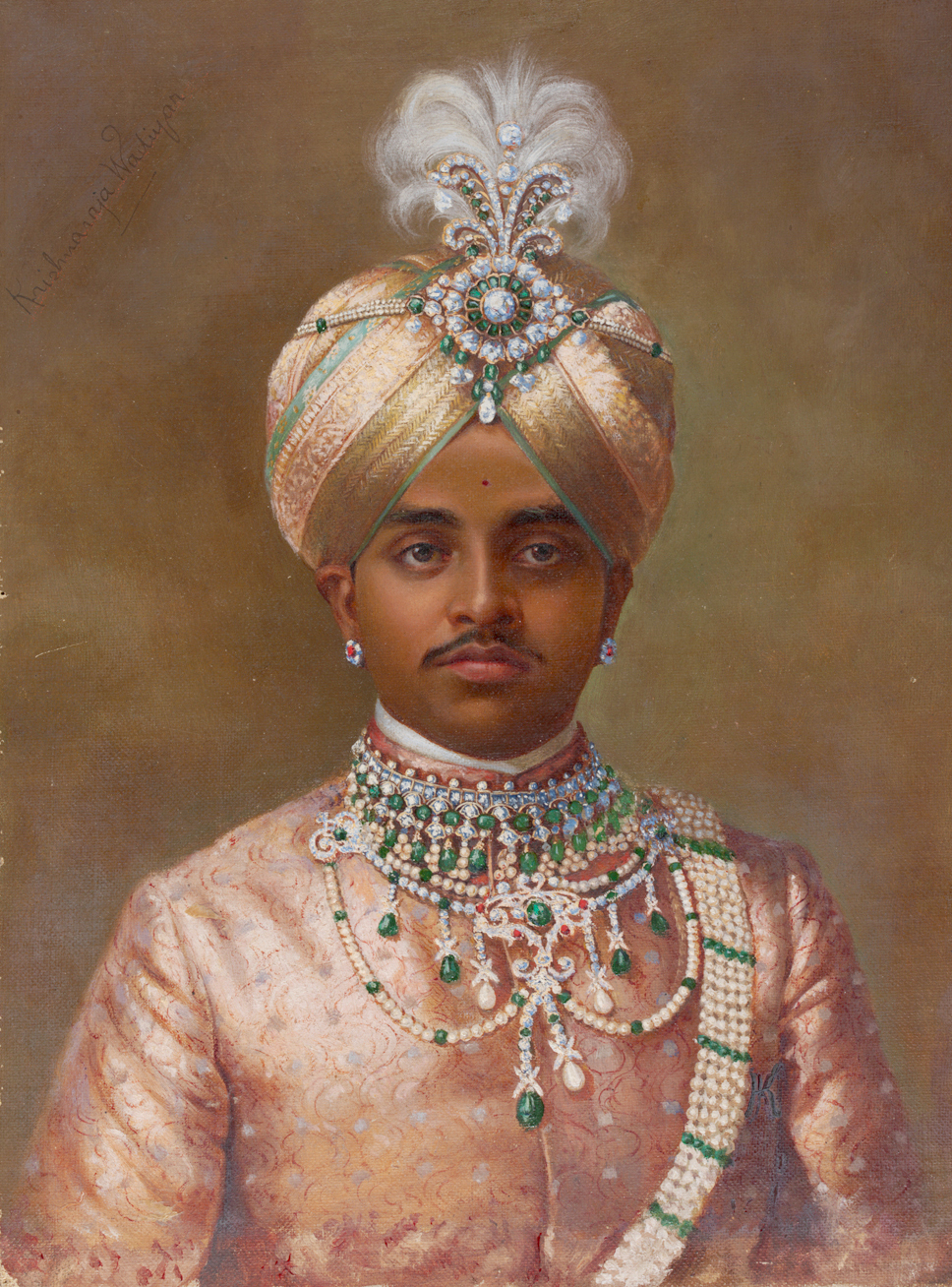
The Maharaja of Mysore sponsored the book, which had been intended to be the first of a series. 1906 painting by K. Keshavayya

Hatha yoga, the medieval practice which used asanas (yoga postures) and other practices such as shatkarmas (purifications) to gain moksha, spiritual liberation, was despised and in decline by the start of the 20th century. Western gymnastics such as Niels Bukh's Primary Gymnastics became popular in India, partly as a result of Hindu nationalism which sought to show Indian men as strong. At the same time, yoga in various forms was being popularised in the West by advocates such as Vivekananda (without asanas), Yogananda, and Yogendra.

The yoga teacher T.K.V. Desikachar, one of Krishnamacharya's sons, explained that his father had intended to write a series of books on yoga, of which this was to have been the first, but the death of his sponsor the Maharaja of Mysore, Krishna Raja Wadiyar IV, in 1940 caused the series to be abandoned. He stated that his father had decided to cover practices (shatkarmas, purifications) such as neti and dhauti "which he himself did not recommend". He noted that the asanas in the book are described in "vinyasa krama", which was the way Krishnamacharya taught yoga to children in the Mysore palace. Other practices which he strongly endorsed like pranayama and meditation were to be topics of later books and were therefore not covered.

Krishnamacharya's disciple and biographer A. G. Mohan states that the book was written "in three nights" according to Krishnamacharya's wife, at the behest of the Maharaja. Mohan notes without comment that the book covers yoga practices other than asanas that Krishnamacharya "did not instruct his students to practice".

== Book ==
=== Publication and translation ===
Yoga Makaranda was published in the Kannada language by the Madurai C.M.V. Press in 1934. A Tamil edition appeared in 1938. An English translation by Lakshmi and Nandini Ranganathan was published in India in 2006, and released by them as a free download. A different English translation by Krishnamacharya's grandson Kausthub Desikachar and son T.K.V. Desikachar was published in paperback in 2011 and online in 2013.

=== Contents ===
The book is introduced with a discussion of why yoga should be practised, the chakras (elements of the subtle body on which yoga is said to operate), pratyahara, dharana and dhyana (elements of Patanjalis's yoga), and who "has the authority to practise Yoga", which in Krishnamacharya's view is "everyone". It discusses the elements of yoga, starting with yamas and niyamas, warning that "sleep, laziness and disease" are obstacles to becoming "an adept yogi". The book then describes where to practise yoga, recommending "a place with plenty of water, a fertile place, a place where there is a bank of a holy river, where there are no crowds, a clean solitary place — such places are superior." It gives a description of the purifications (which it calls shatkriyas) and seals (mudras). The bulk of the book is taken up with a description of 42 asanas. (Note: Krishnamacharya 2006, pp. 51–151)

=== Approach ===
Each asana is described with some paragraphs of instructions, and illustrated with one or more photographs. The student is instructed how to stand, and which limbs should be straight. For many poses, the claimed medical benefits are then described, without adduced evidence. The term vinyasa is used with the meaning of "stage in the execution of an asana". For example, Sarvangasana is introduced with the words "This has 12 vinyasas [stages]. The 8th vinyasa is the asana sthiti [the actual pose]." (Note: Krishnamacharya 2006, p. 146)

=== Illustrations ===
There are four photographs of Krishnamacharya's Yogasala showing the hall and students. The chapter on asanas is illustrated with 95 monochrome photographs, each of an individual performing the named pose. Many are of Krishnamacharya himself; others are of his students, including T. R. S. Sharma as a boy, or of Keshavamurthy, stated by Elliott Goldberg to be his favourite student, who performs difficult poses such as Durvasasana (standing with one leg behind the neck). Some poses, such as Krishnamacharya demonstrating Mayurasana, are on a tiger skin. (Note: Krishnamacharya 2006, p. 145)

=== Nomenclature ===
Krishnamacharya names the asanas, in Sanskrit, by the parts of the body and the stretches involved. For example "Adhomukha Uttanasana" means "Face Down Extended Stretch Pose", while "Supta Utthita Dakshinapada Janusirsasana" is "Reclining Extended Right Foot Head to Knee Pose"; a glossary of Sanskrit is provided in the text. (Note: Krishnamacharya 2006, pp. 159–161)

== Reception ==
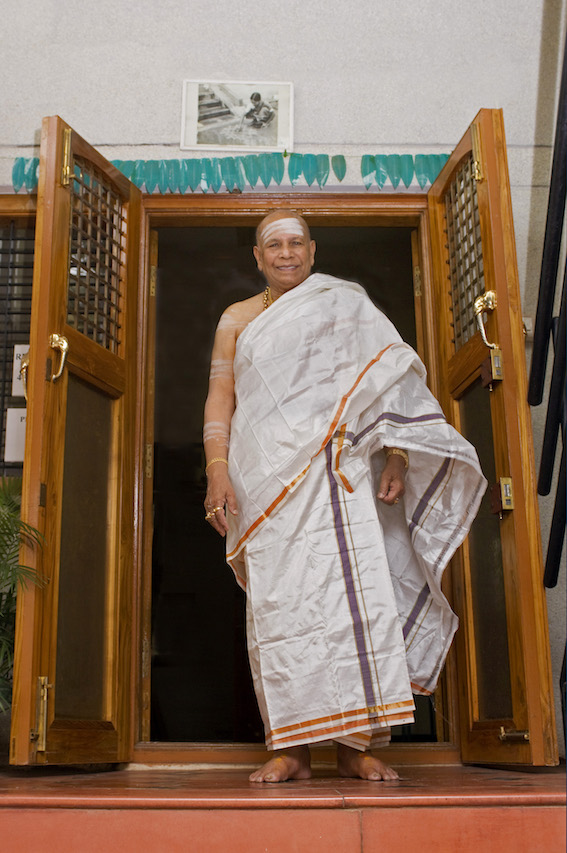
Yoga Makaranda is said to be almost legendary among Pattabhi Jois's students.

The yoga scholar Mark Singleton notes that the book "has quasi-legendary status among contemporary [Ashtanga Vinyasa Yoga] students of Pattabhi Jois [though] very few have actually seen it". He quotes the original introduction by V. Subhramananya Iyer, which called the book "a result of the many tests conducted under the special orders of the Maharaja of Mysore", in other words that the book "was intended to be, and in practice was, experimental (his italics)". Singleton observes that the book called for the asanas to be held for long periods (3 to 15 minutes), arguing that the rapid sequences inherited by his pupil Pattabhi Jois were a special case, even then.

The yoga scholar Norman Sjoman is critical of the book's perfunctory treatment of both academic requirements and yogic practices other than asanas. He comments that Krishnamacharya's list of sources "reveals his relation to tradition", but is "a padded academic bibliography with works referred to that have nothing to do with the tradition he is teaching in". The list includes for instance the well-known hatha yoga texts, the Hatha Yoga Pradipika, the Gheranda Samhita and the Sritattvanidhi as well as the Yoga Upanishads. Sjoman gives as an example the recommendations for vajroli mudra which call for "a glass rod to be inserted into the urethra [of the penis] an inch at a time. His recommendations show that he has most certainly not experimented with this himself in the manner he recommends."

Elliott Goldberg calls this image from Yoga Makaranda of Krishnamacharya with his students performing asanas in the Mysore palace "showy" and "eye-catching" rather than spiritual.

The yoga scholar Elliott Goldberg comments that the photographs of Krishnamacharya's schoolboy pupils in the poses "don't truly capture yogins using their body as a tool for spiritual development either. In fact, the photos demystify whatever spirituality may obtain to the exercises." He adds that the group photographs are "showy ... eye-catching tricks", with boys in familiar asanas but arranged in a pyramid. The vinyasa system of yoga, too, was in Goldberg's view "spectacularly different" from anything practised in India at the time; he is dismissive of Krishnamacharya's "spurious claim for the ancient origin of Vinyasa yoga", citing Singleton's analysis in Yoga Body of its origins in Surya Namaskar, suggesting "self-aggrandizement and self-protection" as the motives. Despite all this, Goldberg states that Krishnamacharya's main interest in yoga was to nourish spirituality (adhyatmika krama), quoting his words in Yoga Makaranda: "Once you stop the oscillating nature of mind, you can reach the level[s] of dhyana, nididhyasanam, and samadhi [the highest levels of Patanjali's eight-limbed yoga]" and through that you can see the atma[n]. He notes that Krishnamacharya was following the traditional interpretation of Patanjali's Yoga Sutras, that the eight limbs formed a sequence of steps.

== See also ==
- Light on Yoga, Krishnamacharya's pupil B. K. S. Iyengar's 1966 encyclopedia of yoga asanas
- Yoga Body, Mark Singleton's 2010 book on the origins of global yoga in physical culture

== Sources ==
- Goldberg, Elliott (2016). The Path of Modern Yoga : the history of an embodied spiritual practice. Rochester, Vermont: Inner Traditions. ISBN 978-1-62055-567-5. OCLC 926062252.
- Krishnamacharya, Tirumalai (2006) [1934]. Yoga Makaranda. Translated by Lakshmi Ranganathan; Nandini Ranganathan.
- Singleton, Mark (2010). Yoga Body : the origins of modern posture practice. Oxford University Press. ISBN 978-0-19-539534-1. OCLC 318191988.
- Sjoman, Norman E. (1999) [1996]. The Yoga Tradition of the Mysore Palace (2nd ed.). Abhinav Publications. ISBN 81-7017-389-2.
