= Yoga Body =

2010 book on the history of yoga as exercise by Mark Singleton

Yoga Body: The Origins of Modern Posture Practice
- On the book's cover, a young woman performs Ustrasana, camel pose
- Author: Mark Singleton
- Subject: History of modern yoga
- Publisher: Oxford University Press
- Publication date: 2010
- Pages: 262
- OCLC: 318191988

Yoga Body: The Origins of Modern Posture Practice is a 2010 book on the origins of modern posture practice by the yoga scholar Mark Singleton. It is based on his PhD thesis, and argues that the yoga known worldwide is, in large part, a radical break from hatha yoga tradition, with different goals, and an unprecedented emphasis on asanas, many of them acquired in the 20th century. By the 19th century, the book explains, asanas and their ascetic practitioners were despised, and the yoga that Vivekananda brought to the West in the 1890s was asana-free. Yet, from the 1920s, an asana-based yoga emerged, with an emphasis on its health benefits, and flowing sequences (vinyasas) adapted from the gymnastics of the physical culture movement. This was encouraged by Indian nationalism, with the desire to present an image of health and strength.

The book attracted wide interest, both among scholars and among yoga teachers and practitioners. Its argument has largely been accepted by scholars, and it has encouraged further research into the nature of modern yoga and its origins.

The book was attacked from two sides: saffronising Hindu nationalists wanting to reclaim yoga as a single thing, distinctively Indian; and modern global yoga marketing wanting to wrap its product "in the mantle of antiquity" to maximise sales.

== Book ==
=== Publication ===
Yoga Body was published by Oxford University Press in paperback in 2010. A Serbian translation came out in 2015 with a new preface.

=== Purpose ===
The author, Mark Singleton, sets out the book's purpose as follows:

The book targets an essential, but hitherto largely ignored, aspect of yoga's development. Studies of modern yoga have tended to elide the passage from Vivekananda's āsana-free manifestors of yoga in the mid-1890s to the well-known posture-oriented forms that began to emerge in the 1920s. The two main studies in this area to date, by Elizabeth De Michelis and Joseph Alter, have focused on both these moments in the history of transnational yoga, but they have not offered a good explanation of why āsana was initially excluded and the ways in which it was eventually reclaimed.

=== Contents ===
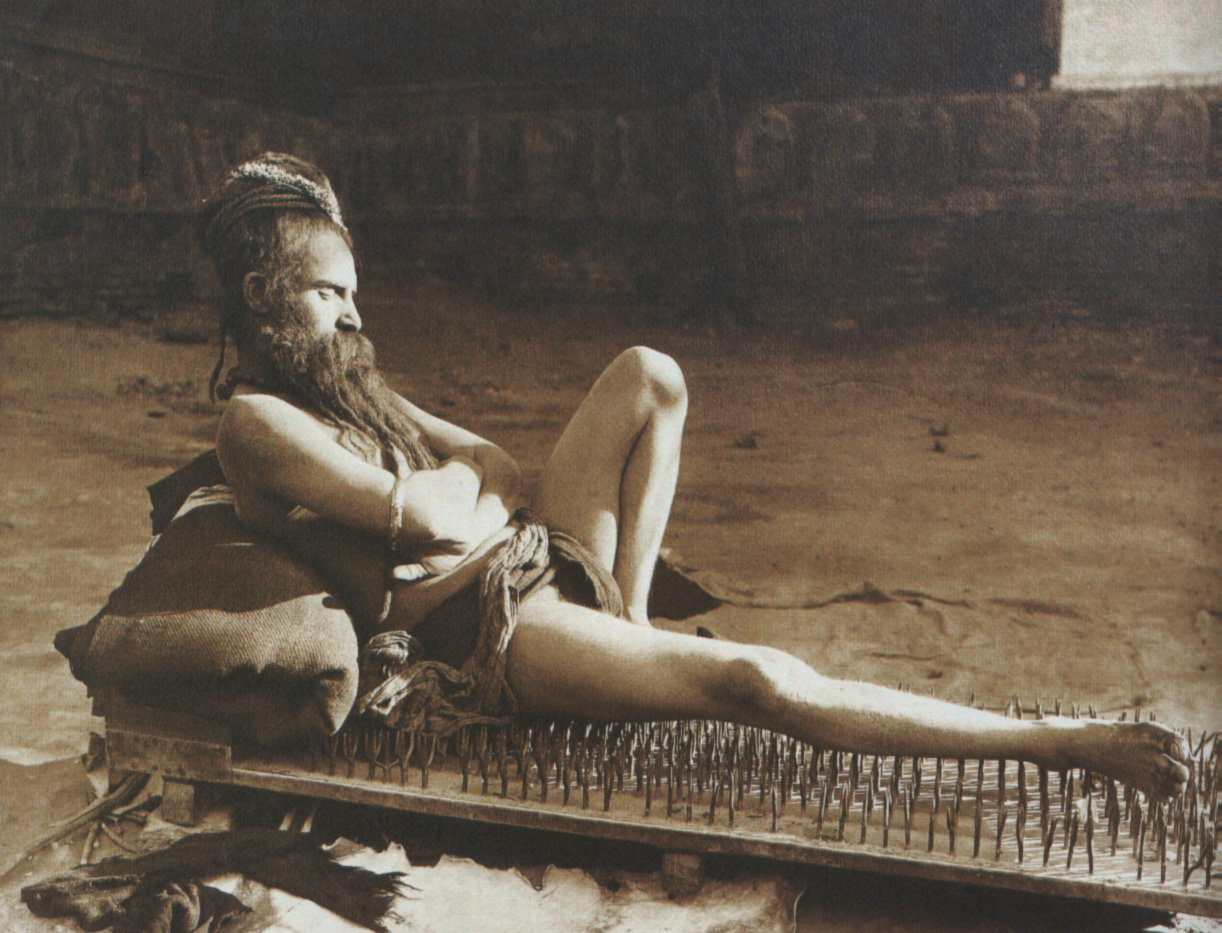
Westerners viewed yoga with suspicion, grouping it with fakirs (pictured in 1907) and charlatanry.

Yoga Body begins by describing traditional yoga in India, including hatha yoga. It then covers the negative image of fakirs and yogins in the European mind in the period up to the 19th century, leading to the āsana-free yoga that Vivekananda adapted and presented to the West. Next it explores in detail the impact of the international physical culture movement on India in the early 20th century, at a time of rising Indian nationalism, in reaction to British colonialism. (Note: Singleton 2010, pp. 81–142) It explores, too, the relationship of yoga and Harmonial Gymnastics and esoteric dance. (Note: Singleton 2010, pp. 143–162) The book then looks at the importance of visual reproduction of images of yoga, through halftone engraving and photography, on the revival of āsana practice. (Note: Singleton 2010, pp. 163–174) Finally, it examines in detail how Krishnamacharya developed a new approach to āsana practice, with flowing movements (vinyasas), in his Mysore yogashala. (Note: Singleton 2010, pp. 175–210) Singleton notes that "yoga" has become almost synonymous with the practice of āsanas, something not true of any pre-modern yoga.

=== Illustrations ===
The book is illustrated with numerous monochrome photographs of yoga pioneers, asanas, and historic images which set modern yoga in its context. There are images of Indian fakirs, Western contortionists, bodybuilders in the physical culture tradition, and pioneers of modern asana-based yoga such as Krishnamacharya and B. K. S. Iyengar.

== Reception ==
=== In favour ===
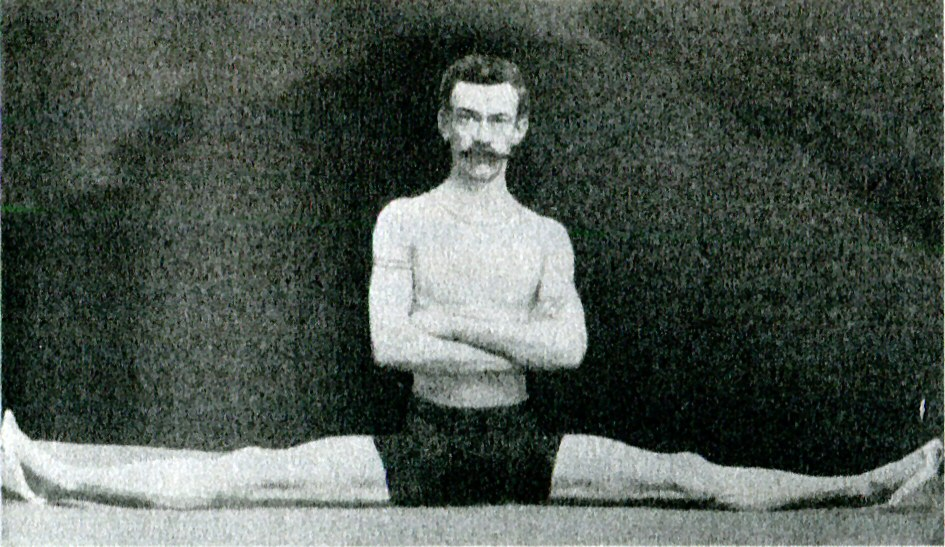
In Yoga Body, Singleton sets modern yoga in context with images such as this pose close to Samakonasana in Thomas Dwight's "The Anatomy of a Contortionist", Scribner's Magazine, April 1889.

Harold Coward, reviewing Yoga Body for the Journal of Hindu-Christian Studies, writes that the book provides a "very detailed analysis" of how hatha yoga changed "from being seen as a blight" to regaining "a positive perception in the modern West." In his view, the book is "an excellent contribution to our understanding of how asana yoga evolved in the decades after Vivekananda and became the basis for much of the postural yoga experienced in Anglophone culture today", offering "user friendly, but serious scholarship" on the history of modern yoga.

The historian Jared Farmer, in Reviews in American History, writes that the book does a great service in enabling study of "this creolized tradition", he neither provides a single clear narrative, nor states which of the many causal factors he identifies are the most important. He notes that Singleton is a scholar-practitioner, "and he adopts a tone of respect even as he skewers sacred cows." Farmer suggests that Singleton may, by looking towards factors in British India, have overlooked some American contexts, and states that "Yoga Body deserves controversy, which I mean as a sincere compliment."

The author and yoga teacher Matthew Remski, writing in Yoga International, called the publication of Yoga Body "a watershed moment in the history of global asana culture." He agrees that the book is "uncomfortable" as it raises many questions about what yoga is and challenges popular assumptions about its age. In Remski's view, the book gently deconstructs terms like "original" and "authentic", pointing instead to the student-teacher relationship. He finds the book strongly "yogic", weaving together "the cultural and the personal", and suggesting that "when you are doing surya namaskāra, your sensation of internal oneness might be vibrating with the conjunction of cultures and histories."

The yoga instructor Timothy Burgin, reviewing the same book for Yoga Basics, calls it "fascinating and remarkable", both well-documented and likely to "ruffle a few yogis' feathers", noting that before the modern yoga transition, "Hatha Yogis were considered to be derelicts and ruffians and were avoided by both native Indians and Westerners alike."

The yoga teacher Jill Miller, reviewing the book on Gaiam, observes that Singleton showed how many modern asanas were "derived during an environment of Indian neo-nationalism and infused with doses of European gymnastics, bodybuilding and the Christian agendas of the YMCA." She records that this agreed with a feeling she had long had, that many of the poses were very similar to those used in martial arts, and that authenticity in yoga was not what it seemed.

Singleton's thesis has launched an academic discourse on what "authenticity" means with respect to modern yoga, as seen for instance in Cristina Renee Sajovich's 2015 graduate thesis Decolonizing Yoga: Authenticity Narratives, Social Feelings & Subversion in Modern Postural Yoga, which endorses Singleton's arguments.

=== Discussion ===
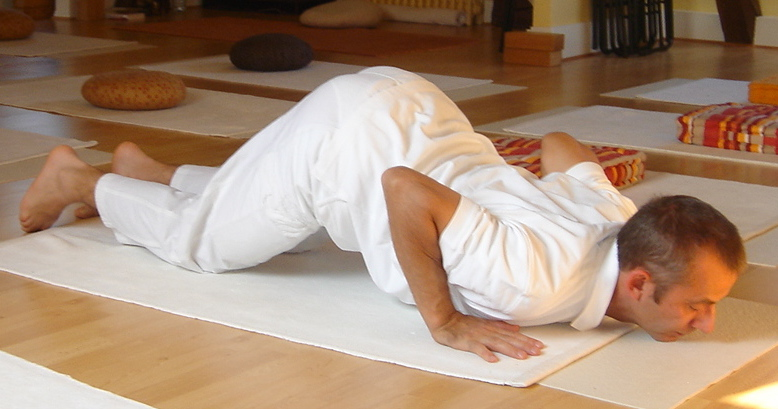
Singleton argued that Astānga yoga may get its name not from Patañjali's eight-fold yoga but from the aṣṭāṅga dandavat pranām pose. (Note: Singleton 2010, p. 205)

In 2011, the yoga scholar and philologist James Mallinson published "A Response to Mark Singleton's Yoga Body", thanking Singleton for "a wonderful piece of work" that explained "how sūrya namaskār had become so integral to yoga when it is nowhere to be found in the [medieval hatha yoga] sources I work with", and recording his eureka moment near the end of the book with Singleton's suggestion that "the modern Aṣṭāṅga yoga gets its name not from Patañjali's eight-fold yoga but from the aṣṭāṅga dandavat pranām, the 'stick-like prostration' in which eight parts of the body are to touch the ground." Admitting himself no expert on modern yoga, he identifies a series of medieval sources that describe non-seated asanas, from mayurasana (the peacock) in the 10th century Vimānārcanākalpa onwards. Mallinson and Singleton became colleagues at SOAS and went on to co-edit the 2017 collection Roots of Yoga which demonstrates in detail the medieval origins of many non-seated asanas, though as Singleton had argued in Yoga Body, only very few standing poses, Vrikshasana (tree pose) among them.

The book provoked discussion among yoga practitioners as well as scholars. On TheBabarazzi blog, Mallinson and the mindful yoga teacher Frank Jude Boccio joined the debate on whether Singleton was ignoring earlier syncretism between yoga and other philosophies. Remski observed that there were ad hominem attacks on Singleton: he was labelled "a debunker, a cultural appropriator, a 'junior scholar from England', and a pro-colonial revisionist intent on delegitimizing the Indian roots of postural practice." Remski notes that most of these emerged and vanished on social media, their ephemerality indicating their "intellectual poverty", but their presence demonstrating Yoga Body's reach to a non-academic audience, "and its sting."

The yoga teacher Bernie Gourley called Singleton's premise "a bold and stunning hypothesis" but stated that he was not persuaded. He argued that Singleton put "immense weight" on a few 19th century sources, mainly Europeans who may not have viewed yoga objectively, and that the choice of the 19th century as a boundary was arbitrary, even if there are few earlier sources. He questioned whether Krishnamacharya was, as Singleton implied, lying about learning his yoga from a scripture (the undocumented Yoga Korunta) from a Himalayan master (Ramamohana Brahmachari). He stated that the book avoided detailed examination of individual asanas, and that many asanas may have existed without documentation.

Seven years after the book's publication, Anya Foxen wrote on the Oxford University Press blog that "Since the publication of Mark Singleton's Yoga Body, the yoga world has been swirling with the notion that the postural practice you'll find in today's fitness centers is not nearly as old as we've liked to imagine. With the release of Singleton's collaboration with James Mallinson—Roots of Yoga—the jury is still out on the precise role of yoga poses in the practice's long and varied history. It is nevertheless plain to see that yoga's root system is far more extensive and complex than even the most respected popularizers, such as B.K.S. Iyengar's midcentury classic Light on Yoga (1966), would have us believe."

=== Singleton's response ===
In 2015, Singleton wrote a careful new preface to introduce the Serbian translation of Yoga Body. It was informed and reviewed by yoga scholars including Andrea Jain, Mallinson, Gudrun Bühnemann, and Elizabeth de Michelis. He corrected the major misconceptions that had appeared in discussions of the book, stating that it did not tell anyone how to practise yoga, nor say what such practice should be like now or in the future; it did not suggest that modern internationalised yoga consisted solely of asanas; it did not assert that asanas had been invented recently; it did not accuse pioneers like Krishnamacharya of plagiarism. He suggested instead that it made more sense

to speak of adaptation, reframing, reinterpretation (and so on) rather than invention, insofar as these terms foreground the ongoing processes of experimentation and bricolage that characterise the recent history of globalised yoga, and keeps us away from debates about the genealogies and ultimate origins of particular postures. It is here, in the very work of interpretation and assimilation of tradition and modernity, that the main interest of this book lies."

Singleton suggested two reasons why Yoga Body had divided opinion so sharply. Firstly, he stated that saffronising Hindu nationalist discourse aims to reclaim yoga (ignoring its multiple meanings) as something distinctively Indian; and that modern global yoga marketing wants to wrap its product "in the mantle of antiquity" to maximise sales. He noted that gurus want to have ancient lineages (parampara) to prove their credentials; and they want to give their own gurus, like Krishnamacharya, a hagiographic image. The truth, however, is in his view something more complex: the old has been adapted and transformed to create something new, suitable for a radically different social environment.

== Sources ==
- Singleton, Mark (2010). Yoga Body: the origins of modern posture practice. Oxford University Press. ISBN 978-0-19-539534-1. OCLC 318191988.
