= Ustrasana =

Kneeling back-bending posture in modern yoga

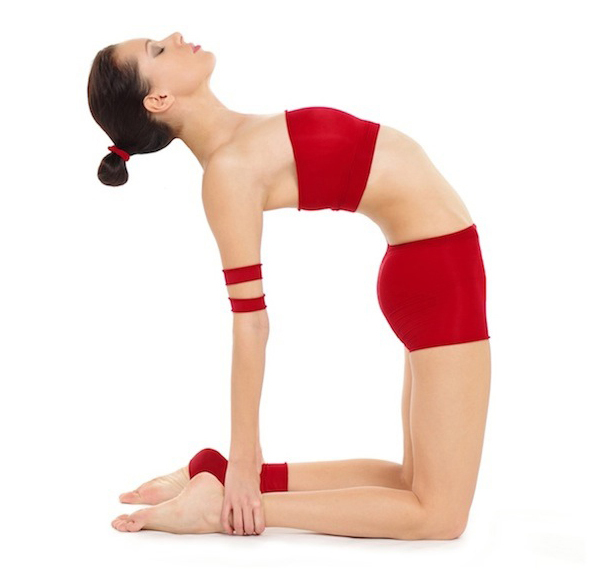
Ustrasana

Ustrasana (Sanskrit: उष्ट्रासन; IAST: Uṣṭrāsana), Ushtrasana, or Camel Pose is a kneeling back-bending asana in modern yoga as exercise.

== Etymology and origins ==
The name comes from the Sanskrit words उष्ट्र Uṣṭra, meaning "camel", and आसन Asana, meaning "posture" or "seat".

A different (standing) pose is given the name Ushtrasana in the 19th century Sritattvanidhi. The modern pose is described in the 20th century by two of Krishnamacharya's pupils, Pattabhi Jois in his Ashtanga (vinyasa) yoga, and B. K. S. Iyengar in his 1966 Light on Yoga.

== Description ==
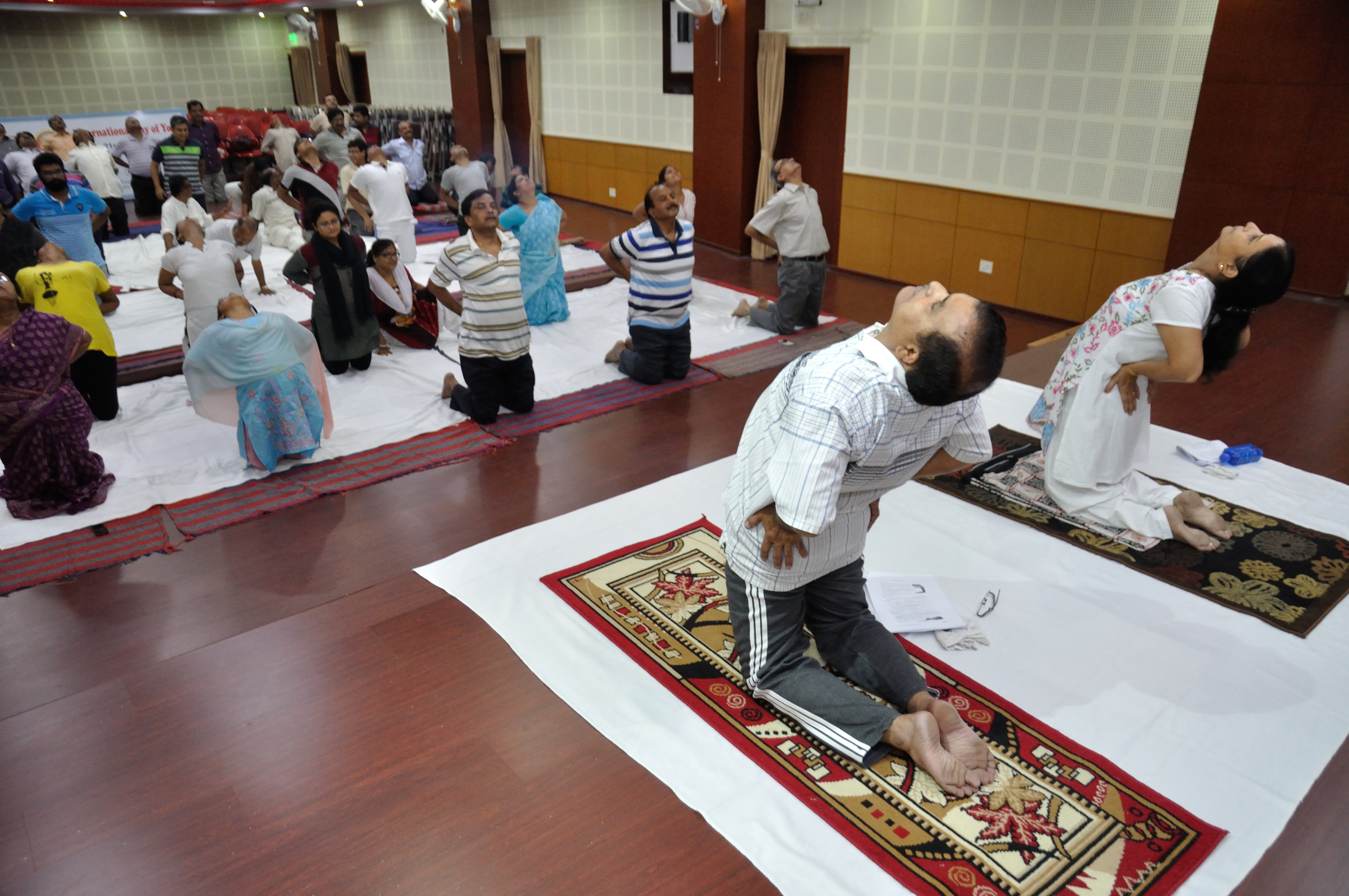
An International Day of Yoga class in Kolkata practising Ardha Ustrasana, Half Camel pose

Ustrasana is a deep backward bend from a kneeling position; the completed pose has the hands on the heels. The backs of the feet may be flat on the floor, or the toes may be tucked under for a slightly less strong backbend.

The pose is one of the 26 asanas in the Bikram Yoga sequence.

== Variations ==
The name Ardha Ustrasana, Half Camel pose, is given to two different poses. One is an easier modification with the hands on the hips; the other has one hand on the heel on the same side, as in the full pose, and the other arm stretched back over the head.

The pose can be modified by providing supports such as yoga bricks beside the calves for the hands.

== See also ==
- List of asanas

== Sources ==
- Iyengar, B. K. S. (1979) [1966]. Light on Yoga: Yoga Dipika. Unwin Paperbacks. ISBN 978-1855381667.
- Sjoman, Norman E. (1999) [1996]. The Yoga Tradition of the Mysore Palace. Abhinav Publications. ISBN 81-7017-389-2.
