= R. Sharath Jois =

Indian yoga teacher (1971–2024)

- Born: Rangaswamy Sharath; 29 September 1971; Mysore, Mysore State, India
- Died: 11 November 2024 (aged 53); Virginia, U.S.
- Occupation: Yoga teacher
- Known for: Ashtanga yoga
- Spouse: Shruthi Jois
- Children: 2
- Relatives: K. Pattabhi Jois (grandfather); Rangaswamy (father); Saraswati Jois (mother); Sharmila Mahesh (sister)
- Website: sharathyogacentre.com

R. Sharath Jois (born Rangaswamy Sharath; 29 September 1971 – 11 November 2024) was an Indian teacher, practitioner and lineage holder (paramaguru) of Ashtanga Yoga, in the tradition of his grandfather K. Pattabhi Jois. He was the director of Sharath Yoga Center in Mysuru, India.

== Early life ==
Jois was born on 29 September 1971 in Mysore, India to Saraswati Rangaswamy, daughter of K. Pattabhi Jois. Jois was born into a family dedicated to the practice, preservation and teaching of Ashtanga yoga as his grandfather had learned from his teacher, T. Krishnamacharya. Jois, being exposed to yoga since birth, began practicing asanas informally around seven years old and continued non-committally until age 14. At the age of 19, he began formal study of the Ashtanga yoga system with his grandfather and was the lineage holder of Ashtanga yoga.

Jois' grandfather, K. Pattabhi Jois, began studying yoga with T. Krishnamacharya at the age of 12, in 1927, and continued his formal study with his teacher until 1954. Pattabhi Jois spent more than 70 years of his life dedicated to practicing and teaching Ashtanga yoga. He established the Ashtanga Yoga Research Institute, his first yoga school, in his home in Lakshmipuram in 1948. To accommodate the increasing number of students coming to study, he opened a new school in Gokulam in 2002.

Jois was beset by many illnesses when he was a child, suffering a year in bed from glandular fever at age four, to a broken leg and rheumatic fever at age seven. At school, he earned a diploma in electronics from JSS in Mysore. He learned his first asanas at age seven. His grandfather used to say that young children could play with postures from the primary and intermediate series, as many of them are easy for children to do.

== Yoga teacher ==
When he was 19 years old, his mother told him that he should begin assisting his grandfather in the yoga shala, as there were many students, and his grandfather was not a young man anymore. From that time, he became Pattabhi Jois's full-time assistant. It was during these years that Sharath's devotion to the practice deepened and he began to intuit its transformative power.

Jois studied the experiential as well as the theoretical aspects of yoga with his grandfather for quite some time before he felt that he was ready to guide others through the method. Sharath noted that it was important for a practitioner to understand the asana and the associated vinyasa before teaching others. He spent countless hours observing his grandfather teach, working with students of various body types, and developing a sense of how to work with individual differences.

As a teacher, Jois reinforces the idea that Ashtanga yoga was a process and that asanas are simply one aspect of the practice, preparing individuals to incorporate the other limbs into their lives. There are many layers to the practice and although it may appear as a linear practice, marked by progression based on the addition of new asanas, it was in fact much more nuanced. This was why students are encouraged to focus on the physical practice because the experiential aspects of the practice are where the true learning occurs, not simply by reading about yoga theory; the practice was the foundation for the practical application of yoga theory. He studied under his grandfather for twenty years.

Jois began traveling internationally with his grandfather in the 1990s to teach Ashtanga yoga. They felt it was imperative to travel and teach an authentic system of yoga in the West where yoga was becoming increasingly popular and being taught in non-traditional ways. In efforts to maintain the integrity and tradition of the practice, he continued to travel and teach worldwide.

== Director of yoga institute ==
In 2007, when Pattabhi Jois was not in good health and unable to teach any longer, Sharath became director of the institute. He has steadily grown into his role as director of KPJAYI and as the senior-most authority on the practice, having studied and practiced all six series with his grandfather. His style of teaching and presence in the shala has been described by a senior student as a balance of strictness and compassion.

In attempts to continue the yoga lineage, he held a teachers' course in the summer for authorized and certified practitioners to ensure the Ashtanga method was being taught in the spirit of the tradition and with respect to the lineage of yoga gurus who have kept the practice alive - Rama Mohan Bramachari, T. Krishnamacharya, and his grandfather. Jois was honoured at a celebration thrown following the completion of one of the teacher's courses in 2014. During this course, Sharath reminded his students of the importance of teaching "from the heart".

Following in the spirit of his late grandfather, Jois held conferences on Saturdays after he led classes to discuss important aspects of the practice, theory, and to address any questions or concerns that students may have concerning the practice. Jois reiterated, that to receive full benefits of the practice, one should practice intentionally with the 4 D's in mind - devotion, dedication, determination, and discipline.

In 2019, Jois's mother, Saraswathi Rangaswamy moved her yoga school to the K. Pattabhi Jois Ashtanga Yoga Institute (KPJAYI) and renamed it the K. Pattabhi Jois Ashtanga Yoga Shala. Sharath Jois opened a new shala, Sharath Yoga Centre.

In Ashtanga Yoga Anusthana, Jois discusses asanas that may have therapeutic value.

== Death ==
On 11 November 2024, Jois was in the United States, visiting the University of Virginia. While hiking with students at nearby Humpback Rock, he suffered a fatal heart attack at the age of 53.

== Awards and distinctions ==
- Sharath has communicated with schools and advocated for the inclusion of yoga into the curriculum at University of Virginia has a traditional Mysore program run by a Sharath Jois Certified teacher since 2012.
- Uttarkashi honoree bestowed title of Mahayogi Guru
- Mysore Yoga honoree bestowed title of Paramaguru

== Publications ==
Jois published Ashtanga Yoga Anusthana which provides an introduction and overview to Ashtanga Yoga, delineating the eight limbs of the practice, the importance of Tristhana and Vinyasa, main asanas of the primary series, and supplemental asanas for therapy.

- Jois, Sharath. Ageless: A Yogi's Secrets to a Long and Healthy Life
- He wrote the foreword to the 2010 edition of Yoga Mala: The Original Teachings of Ashtanga Yoga Master Sri K. Pattabhi Jois
- Featured in LA Yoga
- Featured in Namarupa magazine in interviews and articles
- Written articles for Pushpam Magazine
- Featured in Yoga magazines and Indian newspapers
