= Mysore style =

Yoga teaching practice

The Mysore style of asana practice is the way of teaching yoga as exercise within the Ashtanga (vinyasa) yoga tradition as taught by K. Pattabhi Jois in the southern Indian city of Mysore; its fame has made the city a yoga hub with a substantial yoga tourism business.

== Method ==
Mysore style differs from the usual way of teaching yoga. The class is not "led" as a whole, but rather all instruction is one-on-one within the group class setting. Students practice their own portion of the Ashtanga sequence of asanas at their own pace. The teacher assists each student individually by giving physical adjustments & verbal instruction.

== Style ==
In Mysore style, students learn the fixed order of asanas combining movement with free breathing, with sound. Through vinyasa, there is continuity via the breath from one asana to the next, so that each asana builds from the previous one.

Each student is given and progresses through a yoga routine according to their ability. Newer and beginner students tend to have a much shorter practice than do those with more experience. As one gains more strength, stamina and flexibility, additional asanas are given to the student. The sense of the word "given" in this context comes from how the practice is taught in India, where a yoga practice is something that a teacher gives to a student as a spiritual practice. In the West, people are accustomed to learning a lot of asanas all at once – such as in a typical modern "led" yoga class.

=== Structure ===
Asanas are given, one by one in a sequential order. The structure of the class depends on the teacher being able to keep track of what every student is doing with a quick glance. If students attempt something out of sequence, the teacher is less able to help in the appropriate way. If a student has trouble with a particular asana, the teacher can offer a modification consistent with the intention of the practice. One by one also means that once a student is given a new asana, they practice their sequence up to that asana, then do backbends if applicable (backbending is the climax, not a part of the finishing sequence), and then wind down with the finishing sequence.

== As a practice ==
Ashtanga (vinyasa) yoga is intended to be a daily practice. Traditionally, practice takes place every day except for Saturdays and full or new moon days.
