= Guru (2006 film) =

- Official 2006 film poster, featuring K. Pattabhi Jois
- Directed by: Robert Wilkins
- Release date: 2006
- Running time: 28 minutes
- Language: English

Guru is a British 2006 short documentary film about the guru of yoga as exercise K. Pattabhi Jois, directed by the BBC film producer Robert Wilkins. The film shows Jois and his grandson Sharath Rangaswamy teaching in the yogashala at the Ashtanga Yoga Research Institute in Mysore, India. It combined footage of beginner and advanced students practising the various Ashtanga (vinyasa) yoga series of asanas, from Primary to Advanced, with interviews with Jois and senior staff at the Institute, and street scenes in Mysore. The film also shows Jois's children Saraswati and Manju talk about their father. Wilkins took up Ashtanga Yoga two years before making the film. Wilkins spent several months in Mysore studying for the film.

Extra materials on the DVD include a subtitled interview in Kannada with Jois, providing more information on Ashtanga Yoga, and with a more serious tone.
