= Tim Miller (yoga teacher) =

American teacher and author (born 1951)

Tim Miller (born August 14, 1951) is an American teacher and author on the Ashtanga (vinyasa) yoga style of yoga as exercise.

== Life and work ==
Tim Miller was educated at the University of California, Riverside, where he studied psychology and Eastern philosophy.

Miller was the first American certified by K. Pattabhi Jois to teach Ashtanga yoga and one of the first to bring Ashtanga Yoga to the United States. Vanity Fair refers to Miller as one of Jois' "best known students", and The New York Times refers to Miller as "one of the first Ashtanga teachers in United States." Yoga Journal named him as one of the 10 most influential yoga teachers in America.

Miller met Jois in Encinitas, California in 1978 after practicing yoga for only 8 months. He went to India to study under Jois, and decided to teach yoga. He became Director of the Ashtanga Yoga Center in Encinitas, California in 1981; it has since moved premises several times.

He taught at the first Yoga Journal conference in 1996 and has been a frequent speaker and teacher at subsequent events. He is known for his affable, un-intimidating teaching style.

He has situs inversus viscerum: that is, his internal organs are the mirror image of normal.

== Books and DVDs ==
- Tim Miller, Ashtanga Yoga at the House of Yoga & Zen on Maui, CustomFlix (DVD), (2010)
- K. Pattabhi Jois, Ashtanga Yoga, 1st and 2nd Series, Yoga Works Productions (VHS tapes), Santa Monica, California (1996)
- Larry Schultz and Janice Gates, Ashtanga Yoga As Taught By Shri K. Pattabhi Jois, Foreword by Tim Miller (1997)

== Sources ==
- Schneider, Carrie (2003). American Yoga: The Paths and Practices of America's Greatest Yoga Masters. Barnes & Noble. pp. 60–65. ISBN 0-7607-4558-7.
