= Yoga Korunta =

The Yoga Korunta or Yoga Kuruntha is a purported 5,000 year old (Note: This would long predate any other known yoga texts, the earliest of which were written around the sixth century BC.)(as of 2010) text on yoga, said to have been written in Nepali language by an otherwise unknown author, Vamana Rishi, allegedly discovered by Tirumalai Krishnamacharya in the National Archives of India in the early 20th century, and supposedly lost when Krishnamacharya's only copy was eaten by ants.

Krishnamacharya also told various other stories of how he came across the Yoga Korunta; Fernando Pagés Ruiz noted in the Yoga Journal that he had heard "at least five conflicting accounts" of the supposed text.

Krishnamacharya later related an oral "translation" of the text to his students, such as K. Pattabhi Jois and B. K. S. Iyengar. Jois claimed to have used that as the basis of his Ashtanga (vinyasa) yoga system. The original text reportedly was not preserved, and its historicity and existence has been questioned; Krishnamacharya also spoke of a Yoga Rahasya which similarly has never been seen by anyone else. According to Mark Singleton's Yoga Body: The Origins of Modern Posture Practice, this legacy of Krishnamacharya is one of the bases for "power struggles" among competing schools of modern yoga; he notes that it is surprising that Jois or other pupils did not make copies of the valuable document, and that Krishnamacharya did not bother even to cite it in his 1934 book Yoga Makaranda.

It is said to have been made up of stanzas using rhymed, metered sutras, in the manner common to texts transmitted orally in the guru-shishya tradition. The text is said to have described several lists of many different asana groupings, as well as highly original teachings on vinyasa, drishti, bandhas, mudras and general teachings.

The name Yoga Korunta may be the Tamilized pronunciation of the Sanskrit words Yoga grantha, meaning "book about yoga". Alternatively, there may be some connection with the name of Kapālakuruṇṭaka, the author of the 18th century Haṭhābhyāsapaddhati.
