= A. G. Mohan =

Indian yoga teacher

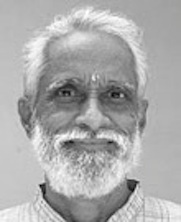
- Born: 1945 (age 80–81); Tamil Nadu, India
- Occupations: Yoga teacher, author, and co-founder of Svastha Yoga & Ayurveda
- Spouse: Indra Mohan
- Children: Ganesh Mohan; Nitya Mohan
- Website: www.svastha.net

A. G. Mohan (born 1945) is an Indian yoga teacher, author, and co-founder of Svastha Yoga & Ayurveda. Mohan was a longtime disciple of Tirumalai Krishnamacharya (1888-1989), the "father of modern yoga".

Mohan co-founded with T.K.V. Desikachar the Krishnamacharya Yoga Mandiram in Chennai, India, and was its Honorary Secretary from its inception, in 1976, to 1989. Mohan was the convener of Krishnamacharya's centenary celebrations.

Indra Mohan, married to A. G. Mohan and co-founder of Svastha Yoga & Ayurveda, is one of the few people who received a post-graduate diploma in yoga from Krishnamacharya.

In the foreword to Yoga for Body, Breath, and Mind, Krishnamacharya stated that his sons had deservedly reached the status of "sathirthyas", people who had studied under a guru. He added that Mohan had studied the Yoga Sutras of Patanjali and was competent to teach asana and pranayama. He noted that Mohan had further studied Samkhya philosophy, while in Ayurveda he has studied diagnosis, treatment, causes of disease, and the body's constitution.

== Svastha Yoga & Ayurveda ==
The Mohans offer their teachings in India and internationally under the banner of Svastha Yoga & Ayurveda. The word svastha in Sanskrit literally means "to stay in one’s own abode" and refers to the state of complete health and balance. Svastha Yoga & Ayurveda advocates an integrated approach using yoga and ayurveda to achieve the state of svastha.

== Works ==
- Mohan, A. G. with Ganesh Mohan. Krishnamacharya: His Life and Teachings. Shambhala Publications, 2010. ISBN 978-1-59030-800-4.
- Mohan, A. G., and Indra Mohan. Yoga Therapy: A Guide to the Therapeutic Use of Yoga and Ayurveda for Health and Fitness. Shambhala Publications, 2004. ISBN 978-1-59030-131-9.
- Mohan, A. G. with foreword by Sri Tirumalai Krishnamacharya. Yoga for Body, Breath, and Mind: A Guide to Personal Reintegration. Shambhala Publications, 2002. ISBN 978-1-57062-977-8.
- Mohan, A. G. with Ganesh Mohan. Yoga Reminder: Lightened Reflections. Svastha Yoga, 2015. ISBN 978-9810943387.
- Mohan, A. G., translator. Yoga-Yajnavalkya. Ganesh & Co., 2000. ISBN 81-85988-15-3.
- Mohan, A. G., translator with Ganesh Mohan. Yoga Yajnavalkya (2nd ed.). Svastha Yoga, 2013. ISBN 978-9810716486.

== See also ==
- Krishnamacharya
