= Ashtanga (vinyasa) yoga =

School of modern yoga

Ashtanga yoga
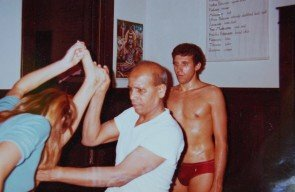
- K. Pattabhi Jois with Larry Schultz, mid 1980s
- Founder: K. Pattabhi Jois
- Established: 1948

Practice emphasises
- Employs Vinyasas, connecting movements

Related schools
- Iyengar yoga

Ashtanga yoga (not to be confused with Patanjali's aṣṭāṅgayoga, the eight limbs of yoga) is a style of yoga as exercise popularised by K. Pattabhi Jois during the twentieth century, often promoted as a dynamic form of medieval hatha yoga. Jois claimed to have learnt the system from his teacher Tirumalai Krishnamacharya. The style is energetic, synchronising breath with movements. The individual poses (asanas) are linked by flowing movements called vinyasas.

Jois established his Ashtanga Yoga Research Institute in Mysore, Karnataka, in 1948. The school created the "Mysore style" of teaching in which students practice the sequences they know at their own pace, and are instructed individually by the teacher. Ashtanga yoga has given rise to various spinoff styles of Power Yoga.

== Approach ==
Traditionally, Ashtanga yoga students memorised a sequence of asanas and practised it together without being led by a teacher. Teacher-led classes were introduced in K. Pattabhi Jois's later years. Such classes are typically taught twice per week in place of Mysore style classes. Teachers guide the practice, adjusting and assisting with postures and leading the group of students through a series of postures all at the same time.

=== Sequences and series ===
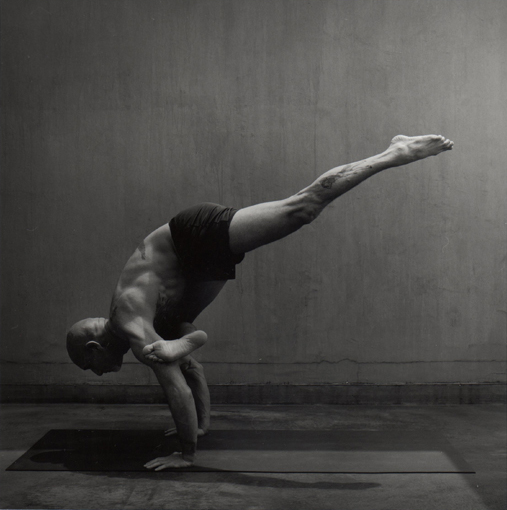
Eka Pada Galavasana, flying pigeon pose. Ashtanga's advanced (A) Series

An Ashtanga yoga practice typically begins with five repetitions of surya namaskara A and B respectively, followed by a standing sequence. The practitioner then progresses through one of six series of postures, followed by a standard closing sequence.

The six series are:

1. The primary series: Yoga chikitsa, yoga for health or yoga therapy
2. The intermediate series: Nadishodhana, the nerve purifier (the "second series")
3. The Advanced series: Sthira bhaga, centering of strength

1. Advanced A, or third series
2. Advanced B, or fourth series
3. Advanced C, or fifth series
4. Advanced D, or sixth series

There were originally four series on the ashtanga vinyasa syllabus: primary, intermediate, advanced A, and advanced B. A fifth series was the "Rishi series", which Pattabhi Jois said could be performed once a practitioner had mastered the preceding four series.

=== Method of instruction ===
According to Pattabhi Jois's grandson R. Sharath Jois, practitioners should master each pose separately before attempting the others that follow. However, Pattabhi Jois's son Manju Jois disagreed; in his view, students were occasionally allowed to practice the postures in a non-linear format.

Since the beginning of the twenty-first century, a new generation of ashtanga vinyasa yoga teachers have embraced Sharath's rules, teaching in a linear style without variations. Practice typically takes place in a strict, Mysore-style environment under the guidance of a Sharath-approved teacher. Workshops, detailed alignment instructions and strength-building exercises should not form part of the method, neither for the practitioner nor for the teacher. However, most teachers who claim to have been taught by Sharath do in practice employ the above methods, exercises and postures in their teaching.

== Components ==
Ashtanga vinyasa yoga emphasises certain key components, namely tristhana ("three places of action or attention", or the more physical aspects of poses) and vinyasa (which Sharath Jois defines as a system of breathing and movement).

=== Opening chant ===
Ashtanga practice is traditionally started with the following Sanskrit invocation to Patanjali:

Sanskrit	Translation
vande gurūṇāṁ caraṇāravinde saṁdarśita-svātma-sukhāvabodhe niḥśreyase jāṅ̇galikāyamāne saṁsāra-hālāhala-mohaśāntyai ābāhu puruṣākāraṁ śaṅ̇kha-cakrāsi-dhāriṇam sahasra-śirasaṁ śvetam praṇamāmi patañjalim	I bow to the lotus feet of the gurus, The awakening happiness of one's own-self revealed, Beyond better, acting like the jungle physician, Pacifying delusion, the poison of Samsara. Taking the form of a man to the shoulders, Holding a conch, a discus, and a sword, One thousand heads white, To Patanjali, I salute.

=== Tristhana ===
Tristhana means the three places of attention or action: breathing system (pranayama), posture (asana), and looking place (drishti). These are considered core concepts for ashtanga yoga practice, encompassing the three levels of purification: the body, nervous system, and the mind. They are supposed to be performed together.

==== Asana ====
Each asana in ashtanga yoga is part of a set sequence, as described above. The stated purpose of the asanas is to increase the strength and flexibility of the body. Officially, the style is accompanied by very little alignment instruction. Breathing is ideally even and steady, in terms of the length of the inhalations and exhalations.

==== Breath ====
In his book Yoga Mala, Pattabhi Jois recommends remaining in each posture for five to eight breaths, or else staying in each posture for as long as possible. Breathing instructions given are to do rechaka and puraka (to exhale and inhale) as much as possible. "It is sufficient, however, to breathe in and out five to eight times in each posture." In an interview regarding the length of the breath, Pattabhi Jois instructs practitioners to inhale for ten to fifteen seconds, and to exhale for ten to fifteen seconds. He goes on to clarify: "[if] your breath strength is possibly ten-second inhalations and exhalations, you do ten; fifteen seconds possible, you do fifteen. One hundred possible, you perform one hundred. Five is possible, you do five". His son Manju Jois also recommends taking more breaths in difficult postures. His grandson Sharath Jois also says that, in the beginning, it might be needed to take more breaths.

Various people have discussed the specific process of breathing in ashtanga vinyasa yoga. Pattabhi Jois recommended breathing fully and deeply with the mouth closed. Manju Jois recommends ujjayi, referring to a breathing style called dirgha rechaka puraka, meaning long exhalations and inhalations. "It should be dirgha... long, and like music. The sound is very important. You have to do the ujjayi pranayama". In late 2011, Sharath Jois stated that ujjayi breathing as such was not to be performed in the asana practice, but that asanas should be accompanied merely by deep breathing with sound. He reiterated this notion in a conference in 2013, stating: "You do normal breath, inhalation and exhalation with sound. Ujjayi breath is a type of pranayama. This is just normal breath with free flow".

Ashtanga yoga teaches that other types of pranayama should be practised when the asanas have been mastered. Pattabhi Jois originally taught pranayama to those practicing the second series, but later changed this, teaching pranayama after the third series.

Sharath Jois later produced a series of videos teaching alternate nostril breathing to beginners. This pranayama practice was never taught to beginners by his grandfather.

=== Vinyasa ===
Vinyasas are flowing sequences of movements that connect each asana to the next. Additionally, modern vinyasa yoga coordinates the breath with the vinyasa transition movements between the asanas.

According to Sharath Jois, without citing any medical evidence, the purpose of vinyasas is to purify the blood, heating it in order to clarify and circulate it by the practice of asanas.

=== Bandhas ===
Bandhas are one of the key elements of ashtanga vinyasa yoga. They are a means for practicing concentration (Dhāraṇā). There are three principal bandhas which are considered internal body locks:

- Mula Bandha or root lock at the pelvic floor (drawing in the perineum)
- Uddiyana Bandha, drawing back the abdomen approximately four inches below the navel. It consists of lightly constricting the transverse abdominis muscle, which runs horizontally across the abdomen and is used to draw abdominal contents in against the spine. Richard Freeman says that Uddiyana Bandha is in fact only a slight suction inward just above the pubic bone.
- Jalandhara bandha, throat lock (achieved by lowering the chin slightly while raising the sternum).

Both Pattabhi Jois and Sharath Jois recommend practising mula bandha and uddiyana bandha even when not practicing asanas. Pattabhi Jois explains: (translated quote) "You completely exhale, apply mula bandha and after inhaling you apply uddiyana bandha. Both bandhas are very important... After bandha practice, take [your attention] to the location where they are applied and maintain that attention at all times, while walking, talking, sleeping and when walk is finished. Always you control mula bandha".

Sharath Jois says: "Without bandhas, breathing will not be correct, and the asanas will give no benefit".

=== Rest ===
Sessions end with resting for 5 minutes.

=== Closing chant ===
Ashtanga practice traditionally closes with the "mangala mantra" (Lokaksema):

Sanskrit	Translation
Om svasti prajābhyaḥ paripālayantāṁ nyāyena mārgeṇa mahīṁ mahīśāḥ go-brāhmaṇebhyaḥ śubham astu nityaṁ lokāḥ samastāḥ sukhino bhavantu Om Śāntiḥ Śāntiḥ Śāntiḥ	May all be well with mankind, May the leaders of the Earth protect in every way by keeping to the right path. May there be goodness for those who know the Earth to be sacred. May all the worlds be happy.

== History ==
Pattabhi Jois claimed to have learned the system of ashtanga from Tirumalai Krishnamacharya, who in turn claimed to have learned it from a supposed text called Yoga Kurunta by the otherwise unknown author Vamama Rishi. This text was said to have been imparted to Krishnamacharya in the early 1900s by his Guru, Yogeshwara Ramamohana Brahmachari. Jois insists that the text described all of the asanas and vinyasas of the sequences of the ashtanga system. However, Krishnamacharya said that the text had been eaten by ants so it is impossible to verify his assertions. Additionally, it is unusual that the text is not mentioned as a source in either of the books by Krishnamacharya, Yoga Makaranda (1934) and Yogāsanagalu (c. 1941).

According to Manju Jois, the sequences of ashtanga yoga were created by Krishnamacharya. There is some evidence to support this in Yoga Makaranda, which lists nearly all the postures of the Pattabhi Jois primary series and several postures from the intermediate and advanced series, described with reference to vinyasa.

There is evidence that the ashtanga yoga series incorporates exercises used by Indian wrestlers and British gymnasts. Research by the scholar-practitioner Mark Singleton details documentary evidence that physical journals in the early 20th century were full of the postural shapes that were very similar to Krishnamacharya's asana system. In particular, the flowing surya namaskara, which later became the basis of Krishnamacharya's Mysore style, was in the 1930s considered as exercise and not part of yoga; the two styles were at that time taught separately, in adjacent halls of the Mysore palace.

=== Etymology ===
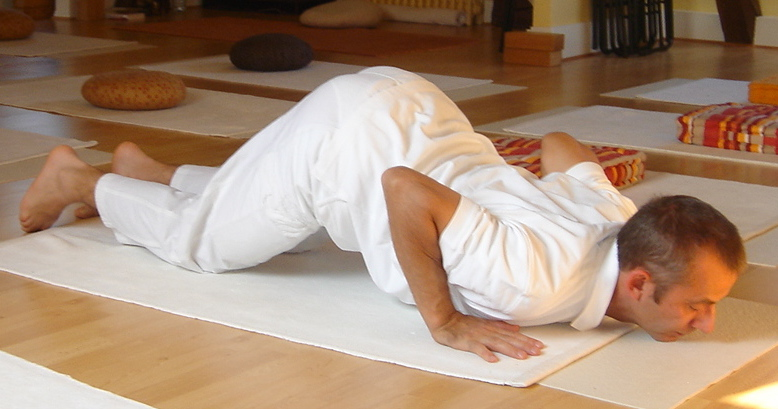
Ashtanga yoga may owe its name to Ashtanga Namaskara, a pose in an early form of Surya Namaskar, rather than to any connection with Patanjali's eight-limbed yoga.

Pattabhi Jois elided any distinction between his sequences of asanas and the eight-limbed ashtanga yoga (Sanskrit अष्टांग asht-anga, "eight limbs") of Patanjali's Yoga Sutras. However, the name ashtanga in Jois's usage may, as yoga scholar Mark Singleton suggests, derive from the old name of Surya Namaskar in the system of dand gymnastic exercises, which was named ashtang dand after one of the original postures in the sequence, Ashtanga Namaskara (now replaced by Chaturanga Dandasana), in which eight body parts all touch the ground, rather than Patanjali's yoga.

=== Tradition ===
There has been much debate over the term "traditional" as applied to ashtanga yoga. The founder's students noted that Jois freely modified the sequence to suit the practitioner. Some of the differences include the addition or subtraction of postures in the sequences, changes to the vinyasa (full and half vinyasa), and specific practice prescriptions to specific people.

Several changes to the practice have been made since its inception. Nancy Gilgoff, an early student, describes many differences in the way she was taught ashtanga to the way it is taught now. According to her experiences, some of the differences include: Pattabhi Jois originally left out seven postures in the standing sequence, but later assigned utthita hasta padangusthasana and ardha baddha padmottanasana before the intermediate series was given; utkatasana, virabhadrasana A and B, parivritta trikonasana, and parivritta parsvakonasana were not in the series at this point; and Jois did not give a vinyasa between the same poses on the different sides of the body or between variations on a pose (e.g., janu sirsasana A, B, and C were done together, followed by a vinyasa. Likewise baddha konasana, upavishta konasana and supta konasana were also grouped together without a vinyasa between them, as were ubhaya padangusthasana and urdhva mukha paschimottanasana.

According to Gilgoff, Pattabhi Jois prescribed practising twice a day, primary and intermediate series, with no vinyasa between sides in krounchasana, bharadvajasana, ardha matsyendrasana, eka pada sirsasana, parighasana, and gomukhasana in the intermediate series. Shalabhasana to parsva dhanurasana were done in a group, with a vinyasa only performed at the end. Ushtrasana through kapotasana also were done altogether. The same went for eka pada sirsasana through yoganidrasana. The closing sequence included only mudrasana, padmasana, and tolasana, until the completion of the intermediate series when the remainder of the closing sequence was assigned. Urdhva dhanurasana and "drop-backs" were taught after the intermediate series. Gilgoff states that the original intermediate series included vrishchikasana after karandavasana and ended with gomukhasana. She also notes that Pattabhi Jois added supta urdhva pada vajrasana as well as the seven headstands when another yogi asked for more; these eight postures were not part of the intermediate series prior to this.

After K. Pattabhi Jois's death in 2009, his grandson R. Sharath Jois succeeded him as the lineage holder (paramaguru) of Ashtanga yoga, teaching first at the K. Pattabhi Jois Ashtanga Yoga Institute before founding his own Sharath Yoga Centre in Mysuru, where he taught until his death in November 2024.

== Power yoga spinoffs ==
Power yoga began in the 1990s via a "nearly simultaneous invention" by two students of K. Pattabhi Jois and similar forms led by other yoga teachers.

Beryl Bender Birch created what Yoga Journal calls "the original power yoga" in 1995.

Bryan Kest, who studied ashtanga yoga under K. Pattabhi Jois, and Baron Baptiste, a Bikram yoga enthusiast, separately put their own spins on the style and provided its branding. Neither Baptiste's power yoga nor Kest's power yoga are synonymous with ashtanga yoga. In 1995, Pattabhi Jois wrote a letter to Yoga Journal expressing his disappointment at the association between his ashtanga yoga and the newly coined power yoga, referring to it as "ignorant bodybuilding".

== Risk of injury ==
In an article published by The Economist, it was reported that "a good number of Mr Jois's students seemed constantly to be limping around with injured knees or backs because they had received his "adjustments", yanking them into Lotus, the splits, or a backbend". Tim Miller, one of Jois's students, indicates that "the adjustments were fairly ferocious". Injuries related to Jois's ashtanga yoga have been the subject of discussion in a Huffington Post article.

In 2008, yoga researchers in Europe published a survey of practitioners of ashtanga yoga that indicated that 62 percent of respondents had suffered at least one injury that lasted longer than one month. However, the survey lacked a control group (of similar people not subject to the treatment, such as people who had practised a different form of yoga), which limited its validity.

== Sources ==
- Jois, K. Pattabhi (2002) [1962]. Yoga Mala (in Kannada). New York: North Point Press. ISBN 978-0-86547-662-2. OCLC 50567767.
- Jois, R. Sharath (2013). Aṣṭāṅga yoga anuṣṭhana. Mysore, India: KPJAYI Mysore. ISBN 978-93-5126-302-9. OCLC 883428674.
- Krishnamacharya, Tirumalai (2006) [1934]. Yoga Makaranda. Translated by Lakshmi Ranganathan; Nandini Ranganathan.
- Singleton, Mark (2010). Yoga Body : the origins of modern posture practice. Oxford University Press. ISBN 978-0-19-539534-1. OCLC 318191988.
- Maehle, Gregor (2006). Ashtanga Yoga: Practice and Philosophy. Doubleview, Western Australia: Kaivalya Publications. ISBN 978-0-9775126-0-7. OCLC 71245040.
- Maehle, Gregor (2007). Ashtanga Yoga: Practice and Philosophy (First ed.). New World Library. ISBN 978-1-57731-606-0.
