= T. K. V. Desikachar =

Indian yoga teacher (1938 – 2016)

- Born: 21 June 1938; Mysore, Mysore district, Kingdom of Mysore (now Karnataka, India)
- Died: 8 August 2016 (aged 78); Chennai, Tamil Nadu, India
- Occupations: Yoga teacher, author
- Known for: Viniyoga
- Spouse: Menaka Desikachar
- Children: Sons Bushan (b1970) & Kausthub (b1975) and a daughter Mekhala (b1978)

Tirumalai Krishnamacharya Venkata Desikachar (21 June 1938 – 8 August 2016), better known as T. K. V. Desikachar, was a yoga teacher, son of the pioneer of modern yoga as exercise, Tirumalai Krishnamacharya. The style that he taught was initially called Viniyoga although he later abandoned that name and asked for the methods he taught to be called "yoga" without special qualification.

== Biography ==
Desikachar was born in Mysore, son of the pioneer of modern yoga Tirumalai Krishnamacharya, under whom he studied. He moved to Madras (now Chennai) in the early 1960s. He had trained as an engineer, but, inspired by his father's teachings, he studied under his father in the 1960s, and from the 1970s he taught in many parts of the world. He published many books, especially the 1995 The Heart of Yoga. During his thirty years of study, Desikachar learned the practice and application of yoga techniques and texts, for therapeutic, exercise, and spiritual purposes.

Desikachar developed Viniyoga, a term from the Yoga Sutras of Patanjali. This approach is claimed to be holistic and aligned with the Yoga Sutras.

In 1976 Desikachar and A. G. Mohan founded the Krishnamacharya Yoga Mandiram (KYM), a yoga therapy clinic and yoga center in Madras, India, as a non-profit public charitable trust. Under Desikachar’s leadership, it offered teacher training and individual instruction in asana, pranayama, meditation, yoga philosophy, and Vedic chanting. It conducted research into the impact of yoga on people suffering from schizophrenia, diabetes, asthma, and depression. It has been recognized by the Scientific and Industrial Research Organisation of the Department for Scientific and Industrial Research, Government of India. The institution is a public registered charity, identified by the Department of Family Health and Welfare of the Government of Tamil Nadu.

== Personal life ==
His wife, Menaka Desikachar, taught yoga and Vedic chanting at KYM and continues to do so at Krishnamacharya Healing and Yoga Foundation (KHYF), founded in 2016. Bushan Desikachar, Dr. Kausthub Desikachar and Mekhala Desikachar are his three children. Kausthub is the Chief Executive and a senior teacher and yoga therapy consultant at KHYF. Kausthub was the Executive Trustee of the Krishnamacharya Yoga Mandiram (KYM) till 2012, when he stepped down after sexual misconduct allegations.

Desikachar died on 8 August 2016 in Chennai, India at the age of 78.

== Bibliography ==
Desikachar's books include:

- Desikachar, T. K. V., with Mary Louise Skelton and John Ross Carter (1980). Religiousness in Yoga. University Press of America.
- ——— (1982). The Yoga of T. Krishnamacharya The University of Virginia.
- ——— (1995). The Heart of Yoga: Developing a Personal Practice. Rochester, Vermont: Inner Traditions International.
- ———, with Kausthub Desikachar and Frans Moors (2001). The Viniyoga of Yoga: Applying Yoga for Healthy Living, Krishnamacharya Yoga Mandiram, India.
- ———, with Mrtyn Neal (2001). What are we seeking, Krishnamacharya Yoga Mandiram, India.
- ——— (2003). Nathamuni’s Yoga Rahasya. Krishnamacharya Yoga Mandiram, India.
- ——— (2003). Reflections on Yogasutra-s of Patanjali Krishnamacharya Yoga Mandiram, India.
- ———, with Kausthub Desikachar (2003). Vedic Chant Companion Krishnamacharya Yoga Mandiram, India.
- ———, with Kausthub Desikachar (2003). Ādi Śaṅkara's Yoga Tāravali: English Translation and Commentary Krishnamacharya Yoga Mandiram, India.
- ———, with R. H. Cravens (2011). Health, Healing, and Beyond: Yoga and the Living Tradition of T. Krishnamacharya, Farrar Strass and Giroux.
