= Vinyāsa =

Transition between two different positions in yoga

A vinyasa (Sanskrit: विन्यास, IAST: vinyāsa) is a smooth transition between asanas in flowing styles of modern yoga as exercise such as Vinyasa Krama Yoga and Ashtanga (vinyasa) Yoga, especially when movement is paired with the breath.

Vinyasas first appear in the teaching of Krishnamacharya in the 1930s, and became widely-known in the Ashtanga Yoga system of one of his pupils, Pattabhi Jois, created in 1948. This made use of the movements of Surya Namaskar, the Sun Salutation, to connect a fixed sequence of asanas, later supplemented by additional sequences in the same style.

== Description ==
The vinyasa forms of yoga used as exercise, including Pattabhi Jois's 1948 Ashtanga (vinyasa) yoga and its spin-off schools such as Beryl Bender Birch's 1995 Power Yoga and others like Baptiste Yoga, Jivamukti Yoga, Vinyasa Flow Yoga, Power Vinyasa Yoga, and Core Strength Vinyasa Yoga, derive from Krishnamacharya's development of a flowing aerobic style of yoga in the Mysore Palace in the early 20th century.

=== Krishnamacharya's usage ===
According to Ashtanga yoga's official history, Krishnamacharya learned the complete system of asanas (postures) and vinyasas (transitions) from an otherwise unknown document, the Yoga Kurunta, supposedly written 5,000 years ago by Vamana Rishi; the history tells that Krishnamacharya copied it out and taught it, unmodified, to Pattabhi Jois. However, the original manuscript was supposedly destroyed by ants, and no copy survives; neither Jois nor any other of Krishnamacharya's pupils transcribed it, as would have been expected in a traditional guru-shishya relationship. Further, Krishnamacharya "surprising[ly]" did not cite the text in his 1935 Yoga Makaranda or his c. 1941 Yogasanagalu. The Yogasanagalu did contain tables of asanas and vinyasas, and these are "comparable" to Jois's system, but far from being fixed as written in an ancient manuscript, Krishnamacharya's "jumping" yoga style at the Mysore Palace was constantly changing, adapted to the needs of specific pupils according to their ages, constitutions (deha), vocations (vrttibheda), capabilities (sakti), and paths (marga); the approach was "experimental". In contrast, the system that Krishnamacharya taught to Jois and that became the basis of Jois's Ashtanga Yoga was fixed. Norman Sjoman notes that Krishnamacharya cited the 19th century Sritattvanidhi which documents asanas used in the Mysore Palace in his early writings; his early vinyasas developed into forms more like those of Jois, something that Sjoman takes as evidence that Krishnamacharya created rather than inherited the vinyasas: "It was not an inherited format".

Krishnamacharya used "vinyasa" in at least two different ways. One was in a broad sense to mean "an appropriately formulated sequence of steps (krama) for approaching a given posture". The other was a "stage in the execution of an asana". For example, in Yoga Makaranda the Sarvangasana sequence is introduced with the words "This has 12 vinyasas [stages]. The 8th vinyasa is the asana sthiti [the actual pose]."

=== Pattabhi Jois's usage ===
In contrast, Pattabhi Jois used "vinyasa" in a narrower sense to mean "the repetitious linking movements" between the asanas of his Ashtanga Yoga. The Ashtanga Yoga teacher Gregor Maehle explains that this flowing style "creates a movement meditation".

The vinyasa sequences used in the touring demonstrations of Krishnamacharya's yoga were, according to an interview with Jois, "virtually identical to the aerobic schema" of modern Ashtanga Yoga, namely "several distinct 'series' within which each main asana is conjoined by a short, repeated, linking series of postures and jumps based on the Surya Namaskar model".

The yoga scholar-practitioner Mark Singleton writes that in 1933, Krishnamacharya deputed Jois to go and teach asana practice at "the Sanskrit Pāṭhaśālā." This meant that, as another of Krishnamacharya's pupils, B. K. S. Iyengar, recorded, Jois was "never a regular student" at Krishnamacharya's yogaśālā, which was founded that same year. Accordingly, Singleton writes, Jois's system of "aerobic sequences", asanas with vinyasas in between, was not Krishnamacharya's usual method. Instead, Singleton suggests, it was a "particularized method of practice" with "a prescribed sequence ... [in] an unchanging order, performed in a counted drill" that Krishnamacharya taught to Jois as suitable "for a novice teacher".

=== Sharath Jois's usage ===
Modern vinyasa yoga such as what was taught by Sharath Jois (grandson of Pattabhi Jois) coordinates the breath with the vinyasa transition movements between asanas. A particular sequence of asanas, also called a vinyasa, is used repeatedly in Ashtanga yoga classes; it involves Chaturanga Dandasana (Low Staff Pose), Urdhva Mukha Svanasana (Upward Dog Pose) and Adho Mukha Svanasana (Downward Dog Pose) to link other asanas. Sharath Jois defines vinyasa as a system of breathing and movement.

== See also ==
- Trul khor

== Sources ==
- Krishnamacharya, Tirumalai (2006) [1934]. Yoga Makaranda. Translated by Lakshmi Ranganathan; Nandini Ranganathan. online
- Singleton, Mark (2010). Yoga Body : the origins of modern posture practice. Oxford University Press. ISBN 978-0-19-539534-1. OCLC 318191988.
- Sjoman, Norman E. (1999) [1996]. The Yoga Tradition of the Mysore Palace (2nd ed.). Abhinav Publications. ISBN 978-81-7017-389-2.
