= Tirumalai Krishnamacharya =

Yogi (1888–1989)

Krishnamacharya
- At 100 years (1988)
- Born: 18 November 1888; Chitradurga district, Mysore Kingdom
- Died: 28 February 1989 (aged 100); Madras, Tamil Nadu, India
- Occupation: Yoga teacher
- Known for: "Father of modern yoga"

Tirumalai Krishnamacharya (18 November 1888 – 28 February 1989) was an Indian yoga teacher, ayurvedic healer and scholar. He is seen as one of the most important gurus of modern yoga, and is often called "Father of Modern Yoga" for his wide influence on the development of postural yoga. Like earlier pioneers influenced by physical culture such as Yogendra and Kuvalayananda, he contributed to the revival of hatha yoga.

Krishnamacharya held degrees in all the six Vedic darśanas, or Indian philosophies. While under the patronage of the King of Mysore, Krishna Raja Wadiyar IV, Krishnamacharya traveled around India giving lectures and demonstrations to promote yoga, including such feats as apparently stopping his heartbeat. He is widely considered as the architect of vinyāsa, in the sense of combining breathing with movement; the style of yoga he created has come to be called Viniyoga or Vinyasa Krama Yoga. Underlying all of Krishnamacharya's teachings was the principle "Teach what is appropriate for an individual." While he is revered in other parts of the world as a yogi, in India Krishnamacharya is mainly known as a healer who drew from both ayurvedic and yogic traditions to restore health and well-being to those he treated. He wrote four books on yoga—Yoga Makaranda (1934), Yogaasanagalu (c. 1941), Yoga Rahasya, and Yogavalli (Chapter 1 – 1988)—as well as several essays and poetic compositions.

Krishnamacharya's students included many of yoga's most renowned and influential teachers: Indra Devi (1899–2002); K. Pattabhi Jois (1915–2009); B. K. S. Iyengar (1918-2014); his son T. K. V. Desikachar (1938-2016); Srivatsa Ramaswami (born 1939); and A. G. Mohan (born 1945). Iyengar, his brother-in-law and founder of Iyengar Yoga, credits Krishnamacharya with encouraging him to learn yoga as a boy in 1934.

== Biography ==
=== Early life ===
Krishnamacharya was born on 18 November 1888 in Muchukundapura, in the Chitradurga district of present-day Karnataka, in South India, to an orthodox Telugu Iyengar family. His parents were Tirumalai Srinivasa Tatacharya, a well-known teacher of the Vedas, and Ranganayakiamma. Krishnamacharya was the eldest of six children. He had two brothers and three sisters. At the age of six, he underwent the educational sacrament of upanayana. He then began learning to speak and write Sanskrit, from texts such as the Amarakosha and to chant the Vedas under the strict tutelage of his father.

When Krishnamacharya was ten, his father died. At the age of twelve, he went to Mysore, then the largest city in Karnataka, where his great-grandfather, Srinivasa Brahmatantra Parakala Swami, was the head of the Parakala Matha. He continued his studies under his great-grandfather's guidance and at Mysore University.

=== Education ===
Krishnamacharya spent much of his youth traveling through India studying the six darśana or Indian philosophies: Vaiśeṣika, Nyāya, Sāṃkhya, Yoga, Mīmāṃsā and Vedānta. In 1906, at the age of eighteen, Krishnamacharya left Mysore to attend university at Banaras, also known as Vārānasī, a city of hundreds of temples and a highly regarded North Indian center of traditional learning. While at university, he studied logic and Sanskrit, working with Brahmashri Shivakumar Shastry, "one of the greatest grammarians of the age". He stated that he learned the Mimamsa from Brahmasri Trilinga Rama Shastri.

In 1914, he once again left for Banaras to attend classes at Queen's College, where he claimed that he earned a number of teaching certificates. During the first year, he had little or no financial support from his family. In order to eat, he followed the rules that were laid down for religious beggars: he was to approach only seven households each day and offer a prayer "in return for wheat flour to mix with water for cakes". Krishnamacharya eventually left Queen's College to study the ṣaḍdarśana (six darshanas) in Vedic philosophy at Patna University, in Bihar, a state in eastern India. He received a scholarship to study Ayurveda under Vaidya Krishnakumar of Bengal.

Krishnamacharya claimed that he was invited to the coronation of the Rajah of Dikkanghat (a principality within Darbhanga), at which he defeated a scholar called Bihari Lal in a debate, and received rewards and honors from the Rajah. He stated that his stay in Banaras lasted 11 years. He further claimed that he studied with the yoga master Sri Babu Bhagavan Das and passed the Samkhya Yoga Examination of Patna, and that many of his instructors recognized his outstanding abilities in yoga, some asking that he teach their children.

=== The tale of Ramamohana Brahmachari and the Yoga Korunta ===
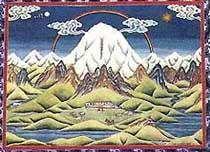
Krishnamacharya claimed that he had spent seven and a half years at the foot of the sacred Mount Kailash in Tibet, learning the Yoga Korunta in the Gurkha language of Nepal.

Krishnamacharya told his pupils, including Iyengar, "an imagined history, it turns out, of thousands of asanas". Mark Singleton and Tara Fraser note that he provided contradictory descriptions of the facts of his own life, sometimes denying tales he had told earlier, and sometimes mischievously adding new versions. According to one such tale, recounted by Mohan, during the vacations, which would last about three months, Krishnamacharya made pilgrimages into the Himalayas. Krishnamacharya claimed in his Yoga Makaranda that at the suggestion of Gaṅgānāth Jhā, he sought to further his yoga studies by seeking a master named Yogeshwara Ramamohana Brahmachari, of Muktinath in Nepal, who had supposedly mastered 7000 asanas. For this venture, Krishnamacharya had to obtain the permission of the Viceroy in Simla, Lord Irwin, who was then suffering from diabetes. At the request of the Viceroy, Krishnamacharya travelled to Simla and taught him yogic practices for six months. The Viceroy's health improved and he developed respect and affection for Krishnamacharya. In 1919, the Viceroy made arrangements for Krishnamacharya's travel to Tibet, supplying three aides and taking care of the expenses. After two and a half months of walking, Krishnamacharya arrived at Sri Brahmachari's school, supposedly a remote cave at the foot of Mount Kailash, where the master lived with his wife and three children. Under Brahmachari's tutelage, Krishnamacharya claimed to have spent seven and a half years studying the Yoga Sūtras of Patañjali, learning asanas and pranayama, and studying the therapeutic aspects of yoga. He was supposedly made to memorize the whole of the Yoga Korunta in the Gurkha language, though no evidence of that text exists. As tradition holds, at the end of his studies with the guru, Krishnamacharya asked what his payment would be. The master responded that Krishnamacharya was to "take a wife, raise children and be a teacher of Yoga".

According to the tale, Krishnamacharya then returned to Varanasi. The Maharaja of Jaipur called him to serve as principal of the Vidyā Śālā in Jaipur; but as he did not like being answerable to many people, Krishnamacharya shortly returned to Varanasi. In accordance with his guru's wish that he live the life of a householder, Krishnamacharya married Namagiriamma in 1925. After his marriage, Krishnamacharya was forced by circumstance to work in a coffee plantation in the Hasan district. It was after a lecture on the Upanishads in Mysore Town Hall in 1931 that he attracted attention as a learned scholar that eventually led to his employment at the palace.

=== Mysore years ===
Krishnamacharya in a yoga demonstration

In 1926, the Maharaja of Mysore, Krishna Raja Wadiyar IV (1884–1940), was in Varanasi to celebrate his mother's 60th birthday and heard about Krishnamacharya's learning and skill as a yoga therapist. The Maharaja met Krishnamacharya and was so impressed by the young man's demeanor, authority, and scholarship that he engaged Krishnamacharya to teach him and his family. Initially, Krishnamacharya taught yoga at the Mysore Palace. He soon became a trusted advisor of the Maharaja, and was given the recognition of Asthana Vidwan — the intelligentsia of the palace.

During the 1920s, Krishnamacharya held numerous demonstrations to stimulate popular interest in yoga. These included suspending his pulse, stopping cars with his bare hands, performing difficult asanas, and lifting heavy objects with his teeth. Palace archive records show that the Maharaja was interested in the promotion of yoga and continually sent Krishnamacharya around the country to give lectures and demonstrations.

In 1931, Krishnamacharya was invited to teach at the Sanskrit College in Mysore. The Maharaja, who felt that yoga had helped cure his many ailments, asked Krishnamacharya to open a yoga school under his patronage and was subsequently given the wing of a nearby palace, the Jaganmohan Palace, to start the Yogashala, an independent yoga institution, which opened on 11 August 1933.

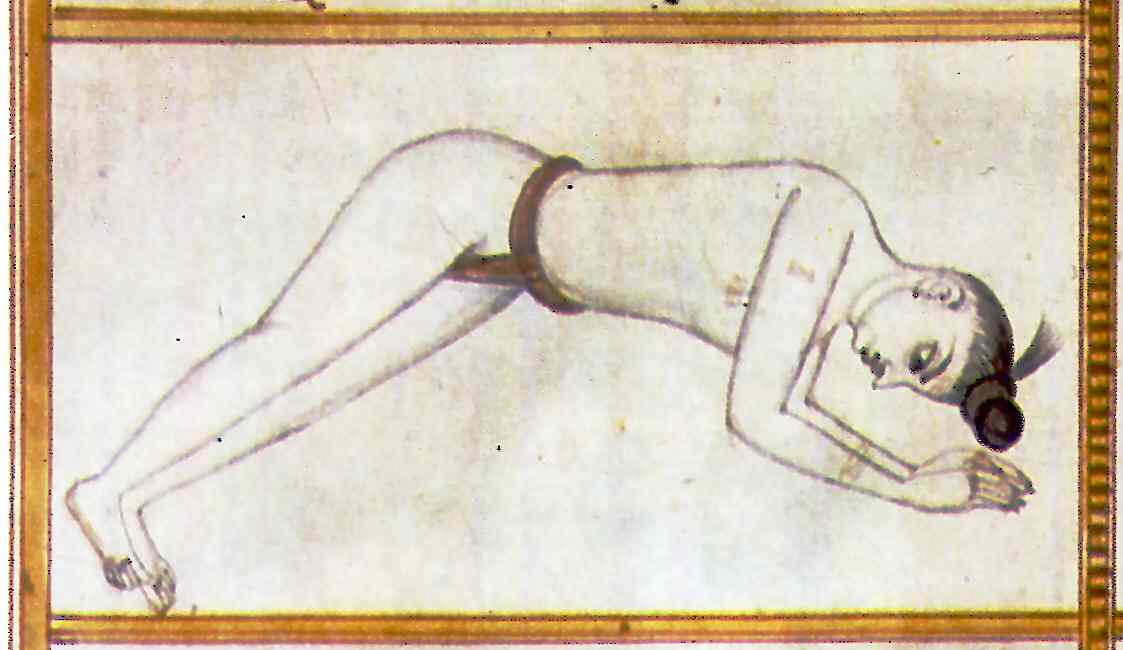
Gajasana, hand-drawn illustration in Sritattvanidhi, 19th century Mysore Palace manuscript. The scholar Norman Sjoman suggests that Krishnamacharya was influenced by the yoga poses in the manuscript.

In 1934, he wrote the book Yoga Makaranda ("Essence of Yoga"), which was published by Mysore University. In the introduction to Yoga Makaranda, Krishnamacharya lists the Sritattvanidhi, a 19th-century treatise containing a yoga section by Maharaja of Mysore, Krishnaraja Wodeyar III (1794–1868), as one of the sources for his book. In The Yoga Tradition of the Mysore Palace, Norman Sjoman asserts that Krishnamacharya was influenced by the Sritattvanidhi and by the Vyayama Dipika, a Western-based gymnastics manual written by the Mysore Palace gymnasts. Mark Singleton argues that he was influenced by the 20th century yoga pioneers Yogendra and Kuvalayananda, and that all three "seamlessly incorporate[d] elements of physical culture into their systems of 'yoga'."

Krishnamacharya, unlike earlier yoga gurus such as Yogendra, "severely criticized his students" including his young brother-in-law, B. K. S. Iyengar. He was equally bad-tempered at home with his family. In the view of the historian of yoga Elliott Goldberg, Iyengar "would never recover from or anywhere near comprehend the damage inflicted on him by Krishnamacharya's abuse" during his teenage years.

In 1940, Krishna Raja Wadiyar IV died. His nephew and successor, Jayachamarajendra Wadiyar (1919–1974), who was less interested in yoga, no longer provided support for publishing texts and sending teams of teachers to surrounding areas. Following political changes in 1946, around the time that India gained independence, a new government came into being and the powers of the maharajas were curtailed. Funding for the yoga school was cut off, and Krishnamacharya struggled to maintain the school. At the age of 60 (1948), Krishnamacharya was forced to travel extensively to find students and provide for his family. The Yogashala in Mysore was ordered to be closed by K.C. Reddy, the first Chief Minister of Mysore State, and the school eventually closed in 1950.

=== Madras years ===
Krishnamacharya teaching a child

After leaving Mysore, Krishnamacharya moved to Bangalore for a couple of years and then, in 1952, was invited to relocate to Madras (now Chennai), by a well-known lawyer who sought Krishnamacharya's help in healing from a stroke. By now, Krishnamacharya was in his sixties, and his reputation for being a strict and intimidating teacher had somewhat mellowed. In Madras, Krishnamacharya accepted a job as a lecturer at Vivekananda College. He also began to acquire yoga students from diverse backgrounds and in various physical conditions, which required him to adapt his teaching to each student's abilities. For the remainder of his teaching life, Krishnamacharya continued to refine this individualized approach, which came to be known as Viniyoga. Many considered Krishnamacharya a yoga master, but he continued to call himself a student because he felt that he was always "studying, exploring and experimenting" with the practice. Throughout his life, Krishnamacharya refused to take credit for his innovative teachings but instead attributed the knowledge to his guru or to ancient texts. Although his knowledge and teaching have influenced yoga throughout the world, Krishnamacharya never left his native India. Yoga Journal wrote:

You may never have heard of him but Tirumalai Krishnamacharya influenced or perhaps even invented your yoga. Whether you practice the dynamic series of Pattabhi Jois, the refined alignments of B. K. S. Iyengar, the classical postures of Indra Devi, or the customized vinyasa of Viniyoga, your practice stems from one source: a five-foot, two-inch Brahmin born more than one hundred years ago in a small South Indian village.

By developing and refining different approaches, Krishnamacharya made yoga accessible to millions around the world.

== Approach ==
Krishnamacharya was a physician of Ayurvedic medicine. He "possessed enormous knowledge of nutrition, herbal medicine, the use of oils, and other remedies". Krishnamacharya's custom as an Ayurvedic practitioner was to begin with a detailed examination to determine the most efficient path to take for a patient. According to Krishnamacharya, even though the source or focus of a disease is in a particular area of the body, he assumed that many other systems in the body, both mental and physical, would also be affected. At some point during or after an initial examination, Krishnamacharya would ask if the patient was willing to follow his guidance. This question was important to a patient's treatment, because Krishnamacharya felt that if the person could not trust him fully there was little chance of his or her being healed.

Krishnamacharya emphasised the use of three of Patanjali's eight limbs of yoga, not only asana but also pranayama and dhyana.

Once a person began seeing Krishnamacharya, he would work with him or her on a number of levels including adjusting their diet; creating herbal medicines; and setting up a series of yoga postures that would be most beneficial. When instructing a person on the practice of yoga, Krishnamacharya particularly stressed the importance of combining breath work (pranayama) with the postures (asanas) of yoga and meditation (dhyana) to reach the desired goal.

Krishnamacharya "believed Yoga to be India's greatest gift to the world." His yoga instruction reflected his conviction that yoga could be both a spiritual practice and a mode of physical healing. His style of yoga is now known as Vinyasa Krama Yoga. Krishnamacharya based his teachings on the Yoga Sutras of Patanjali and the Yoga Yajnavalkya. Whereas Krishnamacharya was deeply devoted to Vaishnavism, he also respected his students' varying religious beliefs, or nonbeliefs. A former student recalls that while leading a meditation, Krishnamacharya instructed students to close their eyes and "think of God. If not God, the sun. If not the sun, your parents." As a result of the teachings he received from his father and other instructors, Krishnamacharya approached every student as "absolutely unique", in the belief that the most important aspect of teaching yoga was that the student be "taught according to his or her individual capacity at any given time". For Krishnamacharya, the path of yoga meant different things for different people, and each person ought to be taught in a manner that he or she understood clearly.

Krishnamacharya's students included many of 20th century yoga's most renowned and influential teachers: Indra Devi; K. Pattabhi Jois; B. K. S. Iyengar; T. K. V. Desikachar; Srivatsa Ramaswami; and A. G. Mohan (born 1945).

Leading yoga teachers among Krishnamacharya's pupils
Student	Relationship	Known for	Founded school	Best-known book
Indra Devi (1899–2002)	pupil	Yoga with Hollywood stars	—	Yoga for Americans 1959
K. Pattabhi Jois (1915–2009)	pupil	Mysore style	Ashtanga vinyasa yoga	Yoga Mala 1999 and Ashtanga Yoga Manual with Lino Miele 2003
B. K. S. Iyengar (1918-2014)	brother-in-law	Precision, props	Iyengar Yoga	Light on Yoga 1966
T. K. V. Desikachar (1938-2016)	son	Viniyoga	Krishnamacharya Yoga Mandiram	The Heart of Yoga 1995
Srivatsa Ramaswami (1939- )	pupil	Vinyasa Krama yoga	—	Complete Book of Vinyasa Yoga 2005
A. G. Mohan (1945- )	pupil	Svastha Yoga & Ayurveda	—	Yoga for Body, Breath, and Mind 2002
Vanda Scaravelli (1908-1999)	pupil by proxy, Krishnamacharya sent Iyengar and Desikachar to teach her	—	Asked her followers not to name schools of yoga after her.	Awakening the Spine 1991

== Accomplishment as a scholar ==
Krishnamacharya was highly regarded as a scholar. He earned degrees in philosophy, logic, divinity, philology, and music. He was twice offered the position of Acharya in the Srivaishnava sampradaya, but he declined in order to stay with his family, in accordance with his guru's wishes.

He also had extensive knowledge of orthodox Hindu rituals. His scholarship in various darshanas of orthodox Indian philosophy earned him titles such as Sāṃkhya-yoga-śikhāmaṇi, Mīmāṃsā-ratna, Mīmāṃsā-thīrtha, Nyāyācārya, Vedāntavāgīśa, Veda-kesari and Yogācārya.

One of Krishnamacharya's most distinctive teachings was about kuṇḍalinī. To him, kuṇḍalinī is not an energy that rises. Rather, it is a blockage that prevents prāṇa (breath) from rising.

== Works ==
1. Yoga Makaranda (1934)
2. Yogaasanagalu (c. 1941)
3. Yoga Rahasya (2004)
4. Yogavalli (Chapter 1 – 1988)
