= K. Pattabhi Jois =

Indian yoga guru (1915–2009)

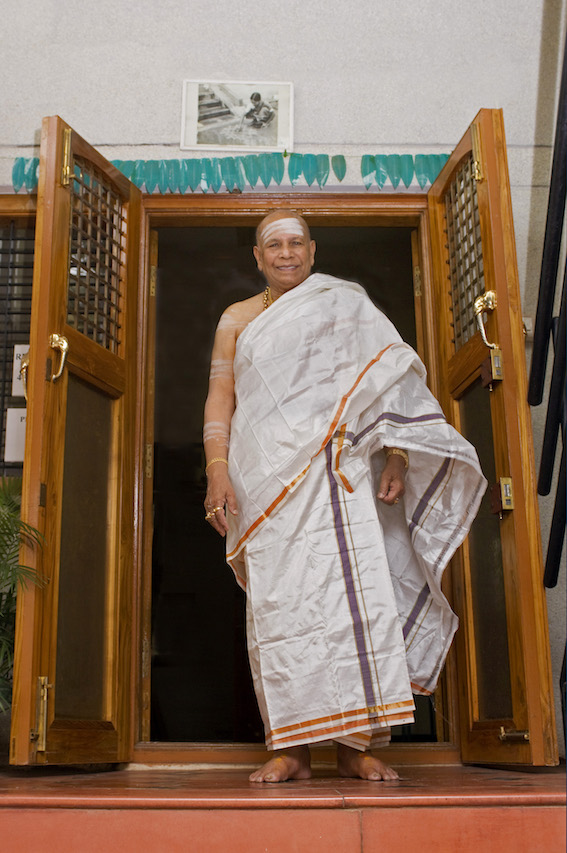
- In the entrance of his institute in Mysore, India, 2006
- Born: 26 July 1915; Kowshika, Hassan, Kingdom of Mysore (now Karnataka, India)
- Died: 18 May 2009 (aged 93); Mysore
- Occupation: Yoga teacher
- Known for: Ashtanga Vinyasa Yoga
- Spouse: Savitramma (Amma)
- Children: Saraswathi Rangaswamy; Mañju; Ramesh
- Relatives: R. Sharath Jois (grandson)

K. Pattabhi Jois (26 July 1915 – 18 May 2009) was a Shaivite Indian yoga guru and who developed and popularized the flowing style of yoga as exercise known as Ashtanga (vinyasa) yoga. (Note: Not to be confused with Patanjali's Ashtanga (eight limbs of yoga).) In 1948, Jois established the Ashtanga Yoga Research Institute in Mysore, India. Pattabhi Jois is one of a short list of Indians instrumental in establishing modern yoga as exercise in the 20th century, along with B. K. S. Iyengar, another pupil of Krishnamacharya in Mysore. Jois sexually abused some of his yoga students by touching inappropriately during adjustments. Sharath Jois has publicly apologised for his grandfather's "improper adjustments".

== Biography ==
=== Early life ===
Krishna Pattabhi Jois was born in Karnataka on 26 July 1915 (Guru Pūrṇimā, full moon day) in the village of Kowshika, near Hassan, Karnataka, Southern India. Jois's father was an astrologer, priest, and landholder. His mother took care of the house and the nine children - five girls and four boys - of whom Pattabhi Jois was the fifth. From the age of five, he was instructed in Sanskrit and rituals by his father. No one else in his family learned yoga.

=== Education ===
In 1927, at the age of 12, Jois attended a lecture and demonstration at the Jubilee Hall in Hassan, Karnataka by T. Krishnamacharya and became his student the next day. He stayed in Kowshika for two years and practiced with Krishnamacharya every day.

In 1930, Jois ran away from home to Mysore to study Sanskrit, with 2 rupees. Around the same time Krishnamacharya departed Hassan to teach elsewhere. Two years later, Jois was reunited with Krishnamacharya, who had also made his way to Mysore. During this time, the Maharaja of Mysore, Krishna Rajendra Wodeyar, had become seriously ill and it is said that Krishnamacharya had healed him, through yoga, where others had failed. The Maharaja became Krishnamacharya's patron and established a yogaśala for him at the Jaganmohan Palace. Jois often accompanied Krishnamacharya in demonstrations, and occasionally assisted Krishnamacharya in class and taught in his absence.

Jois studied with Krishnamacharya from 1927 to 1929 in his own village, and then in Mysore from 1932 to 1953. He studied texts such as Patañjali's Yoga Sūtra, Haṭha Yoga Pradīpikā, Yoga Yajñavalkya and the Upaniṣads.

In 1924 Krishnamacharya supposedly researched an ancient text which he called the Yoga Korunta; he described this as badly damaged and with many missing portions, and claimed he had learned the text from a teacher named Rama Mohan Brahmachari on a supposed seven-year stay in the Himalayas. Jois began his studies with Krishnamacharya in 1927 and was taught what Krishnamacharya called the Yoga Korunta method. An entire system of practices including pranayama, bandhas, (core muscular and energetic locks) and drishti (visual focal points) were included along with āsanas (postures) and vinyāsas (connecting movements), defining the method that Jois went on to teach. Jois stated that he had never seen the text; its authenticity is impossible to validate as no copy has ever been seen by scholars.

A major component of Ashtanga Yoga absent from Krishnamacharya's early teachings was Surya Namaskar, the Sun Salutation. However, Surya Namaskar already existed, and Krishnamacharya was aware of it in the 1930s, as it was being taught, as exercise rather than as yoga, in the hall next to his Yogaśala in the Mysore palace.

=== Career ===
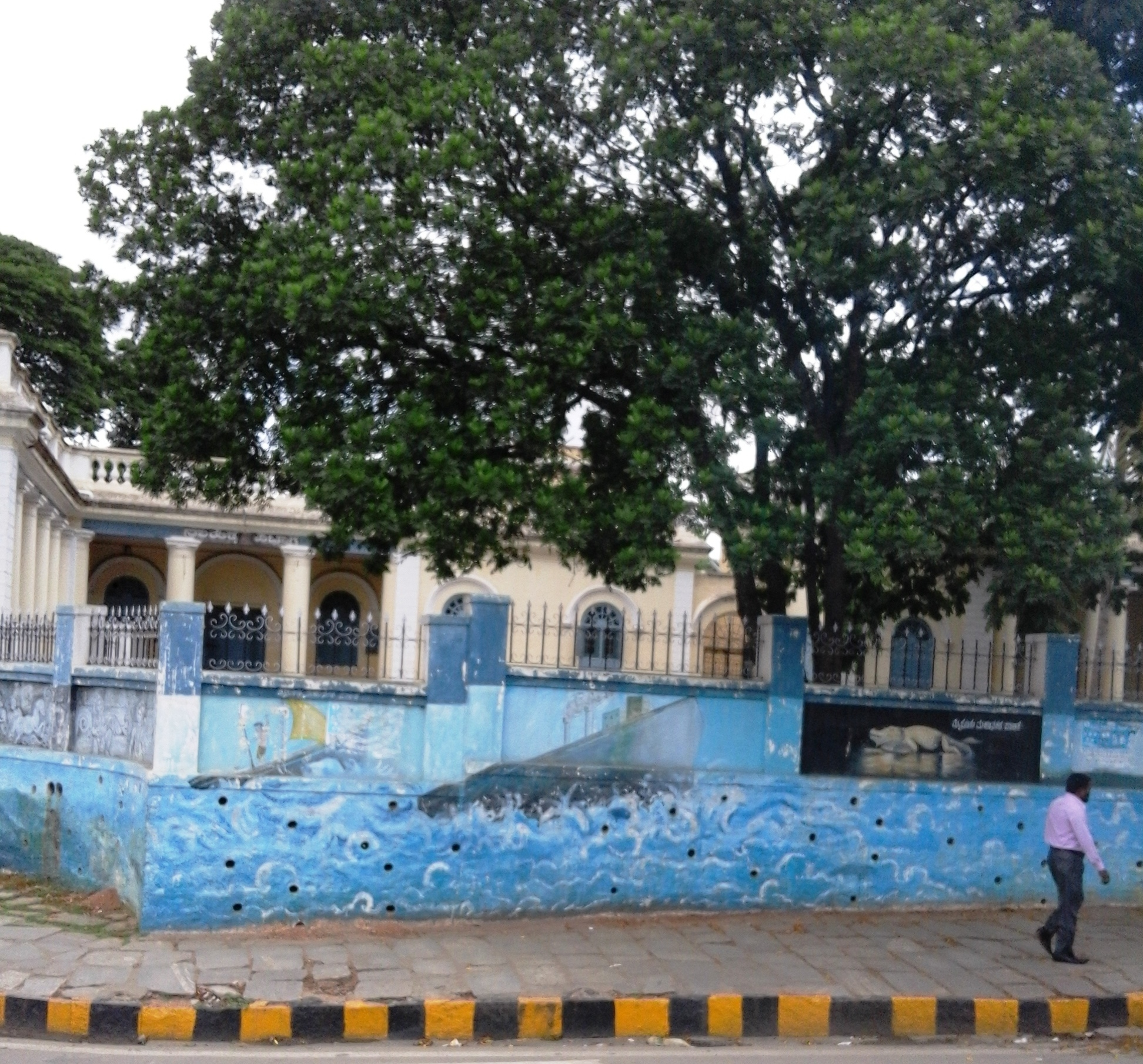
Jois taught yoga at the Sanskrit College, Mysore from 1937 to 1973.

The Maharaja of Mysore sometimes attended classes when Jois was assisting, and offered Jois a teaching position at the Sanskrit College in Mysore with a salary, scholarship to the college and room and board. Jois held a yoga teaching position at the Sanskrit College from 1937 to 1973, becoming vidwan (professor) in 1956, as well as being Honorary Professor of Yoga at the Government College of Indian Medicine from 1976 to 1978.

In 1948, Jois established the Ashtanga Yoga Research Institute at their home in Lakshmipuram. In 1964 he built an extension in the back of the house for a yoga hall. In 1964, a Belgian named André Van Lysebeth spent two months with Jois learning the primary and intermediate series of the Ashtanga Vinyasa Yoga system. Not long afterward, van Lysebeth wrote the book J'apprends le Yoga (1967, English title: Yoga Self-Taught) which mentioned Jois and included his address. This brought Westerners to Mysore to study yoga. The first Americans came, after Jois's son Manju demonstrated yoga at Swami Gitananda's ashram in Pondicherry. To accommodate the increasing number of students, he opened a new school in Gokulam in 2002. Jois continued to teach at the Ashtanga Yoga Research Institute in Mysore, now in the neighbourhood of Gokulam, with his only daughter Saraswathi Rangaswamy (b. 1941) and his grandson Sharath for the rest of his life. He published the book Yoga Mālā, in Kannada in 1958; an English translation appeared in 1999.

His first trip to the West was in 1974, to South America, to deliver a lecture in Sanskrit at an international yoga conference. In 1975 he stayed for four months in Encinitas, California, marking the beginning of Ashtanga Vinyasa Yoga in America. Norman Allen, one of his first western students, collaborated with Jois on his trips to America. He had said on many occasions that there might be only twenty or thirty students practising Ashtanga Yoga in America then, but, 'gradually, gradually, in twenty years, it will be fully spreading'. He returned to the US several times over the next 20 years, to teach yoga at Encinitas and beyond.

Parampara, the passing of knowledge from teacher to pupil (traditionally, from guru to shishya), is said to lie at the heart of Jois's Ashtanga Yoga. Teachers are certified through many years of daily practice and extended trips to Mysore, India, to become authorized "lineage holders". Having studied under Krishnamacharya for many years, Jois expected the same from his students, creating among the most stringent requirements anywhere in yoga teacher training.

=== Family life ===
On the full moon of June 1933, when Jois was 18 years old, he married Savitramma, who affectionately came to be known as Amma by Pattabhi Jois's family and students alike. They had three children: Saraswathi, Mañju and Ramesh.

In 1948, with the help of his students, Jois purchased a home in the section of town called Lakshmipuram. According to Tim Miller, Jois continued to practice asanas until his son Ramesh committed suicide when Jois was in his early 60s.

== Re-evaluation ==
=== Criticisms ===
According to B.K.S. Iyengar, Jois was assigned to teach asana at the Sanskrit Pathshala when Krishnamacharya's yogaśala was opened in 1933, and was "never a regular student". Jois claimed he was B. K. S. Iyengar's teacher, although Iyengar has denied this, and the two men's yoga systems are different; both were taught by Krishnamacharya.

The obituary in The Economist questioned Jois's adherence to the yogic principle of ahimsa or non-violence, writing that "a good number of Mr Jois's students seemed constantly to be limping around with injured knees or backs because they had received his "adjustments", yanking them into Lotus, the splits or a backbend." Adjustments by Jois have been characterized as "overwhelming, producing fear and extreme discomfort in students as they are pushed beyond their physical and psychological comfort zones in often-difficult, even dangerous asana."

=== Sexual abuse ===
The Economist obituary questioned Jois's adherence to the yogic principle of brahmacharya or sexual continence, and made the accusation that some students received different "adjustments"; further evidence and accusations soon emerged in 2009. In 2010, it became public knowledge that Jois had systematically sexually abused some of his female and male yoga students, both in Mysore and during his travels, until his death in 2009. Some of this was straightforward sexual abuse, some under the guise of "adjustments" and sometimes under the guise of "welcoming" and "saying goodbye" to students. The number of victims is unknown, but women and men have described their experiences of abuse, with video and photographic evidence. Some well known Ashtanga Yoga teachers have come forward to corroborate the accusations.

In 2019, R. Sharath Jois published an acknowledgement of his sadness over his grandfather's conduct, apologising to the students concerned, and encouraging them to forgive his grandfather. "It brings me immense pain that I also witnessed him giving improper adjustments", Sharath wrote.

=== Legacy ===
In the early 21st century, Jois's grandson, R. Sharath Jois, led the Ashtanga Yoga community as director of the K. Pattabhi Jois Ashtanga Yoga Institute (KPJAYI) in Mysore. Jois's organization Sonima often provides organizational support to Sharath's world tours, and produces online programs that provide supplementary teaching tools for Ashtanga. Jois's daughter, Saraswathi, and granddaughter, Sharmila, run a yoga school in Mysore and travel the world on teaching tours.

A student, David Life, co-founder of Jivamukti Yoga, has said of Jois, "He was not a monk or a renunciate; he was fearless about combining the path of yogi with the path of participant. He never saw it as separate from our lives. He thought that anyone could attain to yoga if they had the desire and the enthusiasm." A 2006 film Guru was made about him by Robert Wilkins.

== Bibliography ==
- Jois, Pattabhi (1999; revised ed. 2012). Yoga Mala. New York: North Point Press. ISBN 978-0-86547-751-3

== See also ==
- Bikram Choudhury
