= Donna Farhi =

Yoga teacher

Donna Farhi (born 5 June 1959) is a yoga teacher and the author of five books on practicing and teaching yoga. She has been described as a yoga "superstar".

== Life ==
Farhi has been teaching yoga since 1982. She lives in Christchurch, New Zealand where she keeps horses and practises dressage as well as yoga. She tours the world each year to teach yoga in different countries. As well as yoga, she has been influenced by her friend the psychologist Richard Miller, founder of the Integrative Restoration Institute, and teaches the restorative technique of yoga nidra. She studied the asanas with B. K. S. Iyengar in India, finding the practice formal and leading to constant injuries, and then with Angela Farmer to investigate a freer style of practice.

Farhi has written articles for Yoga International and Yoga Journal. She has been described as a yoga "superstar", and has been profiled in at least four publications as an exceptional yoga teacher, including in Janice Gates's 2006 Yogini: The Power of Women in Yoga.

Elle magazine recorded that Farhi had experienced abuse from a yoga teacher when she was "in her late twenties", leading her to contribute to the Yoga Alliance's guidelines for teacher-pupil relationships.

Gates writes that Farhi is saddened by the "very strong, explicit identification with the body" in modern yoga as exercise, a focus that in Farhi's view is diametrically opposed to yoga's traditional philosophy that the focus should instead be on the force (prana) that animates the body. Her teaching "integrates breathing, movement, and inner inquiry".

The yoga teacher and author Cyndi Lee described Farhi as a "renowned yoga teacher and author". The yoga teachers and researchers Theodora Wildcroft and Harriet McAtee call all four of Farhi's first four books "contemporary classics", and write that her fifth book, Pathways to a Centered Body, "is becoming the go-to text" for yoga therapists.

In 2021 Farhi was the first yoga teacher to present on the MasterClass platform.

== Books ==
- 1996: The Breathing Book. Holt, ISBN 978-0805042979
- 2000: Yoga Mind, Body and Spirit. Holt, ISBN 978-0805059700
- 2005: Bringing Yoga to Life. HarperCollins, ISBN 978-0060750466
- 2006: Teaching Yoga. Rodmell, ISBN 978-1930485174
- 2017: Pathways to a Centered Body, 2nd edition. Embodied Wisdom, ISBN 978-0473586003 (with Leila Stuart)

== See also ==
- Yoga for women

== Sources ==
- Gates, Janice (2006). Yogini: Women Visionaries of the Yoga World. Mandala. ISBN 978-1932771886.
