= Janice Gates =

American modern yoga teacher (1965–2022)

- Born: January 28, 1965; Syracuse, New York, U.S.
- Died: October 11, 2022 (aged 57); Fairfax, California, U.S.=
- Occupation: Yoga teacher
- Known for: Yoga therapy, mindful yoga

Janice Gates (January 28, 1965 – October 11, 2022) was a teacher of yoga as exercise and mindful yoga, known for her emphasis on the power of yoginis, women in yoga and her work in yoga therapy.

== Life ==
=== Education ===
Janice Gates was educated at Syracuse University, graduating in 1987 in International Relations. She travelled to Thailand in 1988, taking a meditation retreat which included hatha yoga. Returning to San Francisco, she studied Ashtanga (vinyasa) yoga under Larry Schultz, Tim Miller, Danny Paradise and Richard Freeman. In 1989 she became an Ashtanga Yoga teacher. She injured her back while learning Ashtanga's Third Series, and turned towards therapeutic yoga. She studied with chiropractor Steve Katz and yoga teachers John Friend (founder of Anusara Yoga) and Angela Farmer.

=== Career ===
Gates ran a studio called The Yoga Garden in San Anselmo, California. She taught and facilitated yoga and meditation at Spirit Rock Meditation Center in Woodacre, California and in retreat centres around the world. In 2006 she published a book, Yogini, on leading and pioneering women in yoga, including Nischala Joy Devi, Donna Farhi, Angela Farmer, Lilias Folan, Sharon Gannon (co-founder of Jivamukti Yoga), Gurmukh Kaur Khalsa, Judith Hanson Lasater, Sarah Powers, Shiva Rea, and Rama Jyoti Vernon. She wrote regularly on yoga sequences and meditation for magazines including Yoga Journal and Oprah Magazine. She was for a time president of the International Association of Yoga Therapists. She was a mentor on the Mindfulness Meditation Teacher Certification Program. She trained healthcare professionals and yoga teachers in yoga therapy.

Gates stated that yoga is more than postures (asanas); she used "all the tools of yoga — breath work, sound, visualization, and meditation — and tailor[ed] them to a client's specific health condition." She was identified by Yoga Journal as one of the people who had "each, independently, discovered the benefits of merging mindfulness with asana", leading to "something we might call 'mindful yoga'."

=== Personal life ===
Gates was married with a daughter. They lived in Fairfax, California. She died on October 11, 2022, aged 57.

== Works ==
- Yogini: Women Visionaries of the Yoga World. Mandala. 2006. ISBN 978-1932771886.
