= Nischala Joy Devi =

Nischala Joy Devi is a published author and teacher of yoga.

== Life ==
Nischala Joy Devi was trained in conventional medicine and is an international advocate for Yoga and its subtle uses for spiritual growth as well as physical and mental healing. She was a monastic disciple of Swami Satchidananda, creator of Integral Yoga, for over 20 years. She especially approved of the fact that Satchidananda was trained in and continued Swami Sivananda's tradition of initiating women as monks (sanyassins) and treating women as equals, despite much criticism from other leading Hindus. The pioneer of modern yoga Indra Devi, one of the few female disciples of Krishnamacharya, assisted her in leaving the ashram to develop her own approach.

She cofounded the Commonweal Cancer Help Program and created the yoga section of the Dean Ornish Program for Reversing Heart Disease. She then went on to develop and teach a training program in working with cancer and cardiac patients for yoga teachers and health workers called "Yoga of the Heart". She has stated that "yoga is not a treatment, it is a consciousness that allows health, balance, and joy to be our companions throughout our entire life's journey.

She created Healing Relationships, a training meant to enhance intuition and assessment skills for yoga therapists. She serves on the Advisory Council for the International Association of Yoga Therapists.

== Works ==
- 2000 The Healing Path of Yoga: Time-Honored Wisdom and Scientifically Proven Methods that Alleviate Stress, Open Your Heart, and Enrich your Life. Three Rivers Press. ISBN 978-0609805022
- 2007 The Secret Power Of Yoga: A Woman's Guide to the Heart and Spirit of the Yoga Sutras. Three Rivers Press. ISBN 978-0307339690 Also published in 2007 as an audiobook by Mercury Multimedia.
- 2019 The Namaste Effect: Expressing Universal Love Through the Chakras. Lotus Flower Books. ISBN 978-1945422652 Also published in 2019 as an audiobook by Mercury Multimedia.

== Reception ==
Devi has been featured in books about yoga including Sara Cryer's The Four Stages of Yoga: How to Lead a Fulfilling Life; Victoria Bailey's Sharing Sadhana: Insights and Inspiration for a Personal Yoga Practice; Timothy McCall's Yoga as Medicine: The Yogic Prescription for Health and Healing; Janice Gates's Yogini: The Power of Women in Yoga; and Carrie Schneider's American Yoga: The Paths and Practices of America's Greatest Yoga Masters.

== See also ==
- Yoga for therapeutic purposes

== Sources ==
- Gates, Janice (2006). Yogini: Women Visionaries of the Yoga World. Mandala. ISBN 978-1932771886.
