= Shiva Rea =

American yoga teacher

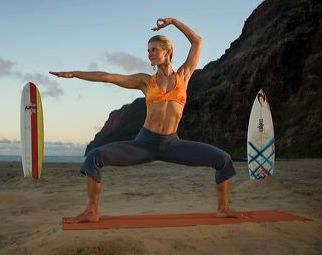

Personal information
- Nationality: American
- Born: 1967; Hermosa Beach, California

Sport
- Sport: Yoga, trance dance

Shiva Rea is a teacher of Vinyasa flow yoga and yoga trance dance. She is the founder of Prana Vinyasa Yoga. She is one of the best-known yoga teachers in America, and around the world.

== Life ==
Shiva Rea was born in Hermosa Beach, California, in 1967; her father, liking the image of Nataraja, dancing Shiva, named her after that Hindu deity. She started practicing yoga when she was 14 years old, learning from a library book. She studied dance anthropology at UCLA, completing her master's thesis in 1997 on "hatha yoga as a practice of embodiment". She studied under yoga and tantra masters including Sivananda Saraswati and Daniel Odier.

She practised the vigorous Ashtanga (vinyasa) yoga for ten years, adopting a more restorative style when she became pregnant. She teaches Vinyasa flow yoga, having created her own style called Prana Vinyasa, and yoga trance dance. She teaches in the USA and many countries around the world, touring each year. Teachers are similarly trained in the USA and around the world in 200, 300 and 500 hour courses in her Prana Vinyasa yoga, which claims to combine tantra, yoga, and ayurveda. She has contributed to publications including Yoga Journal and Yoga International.

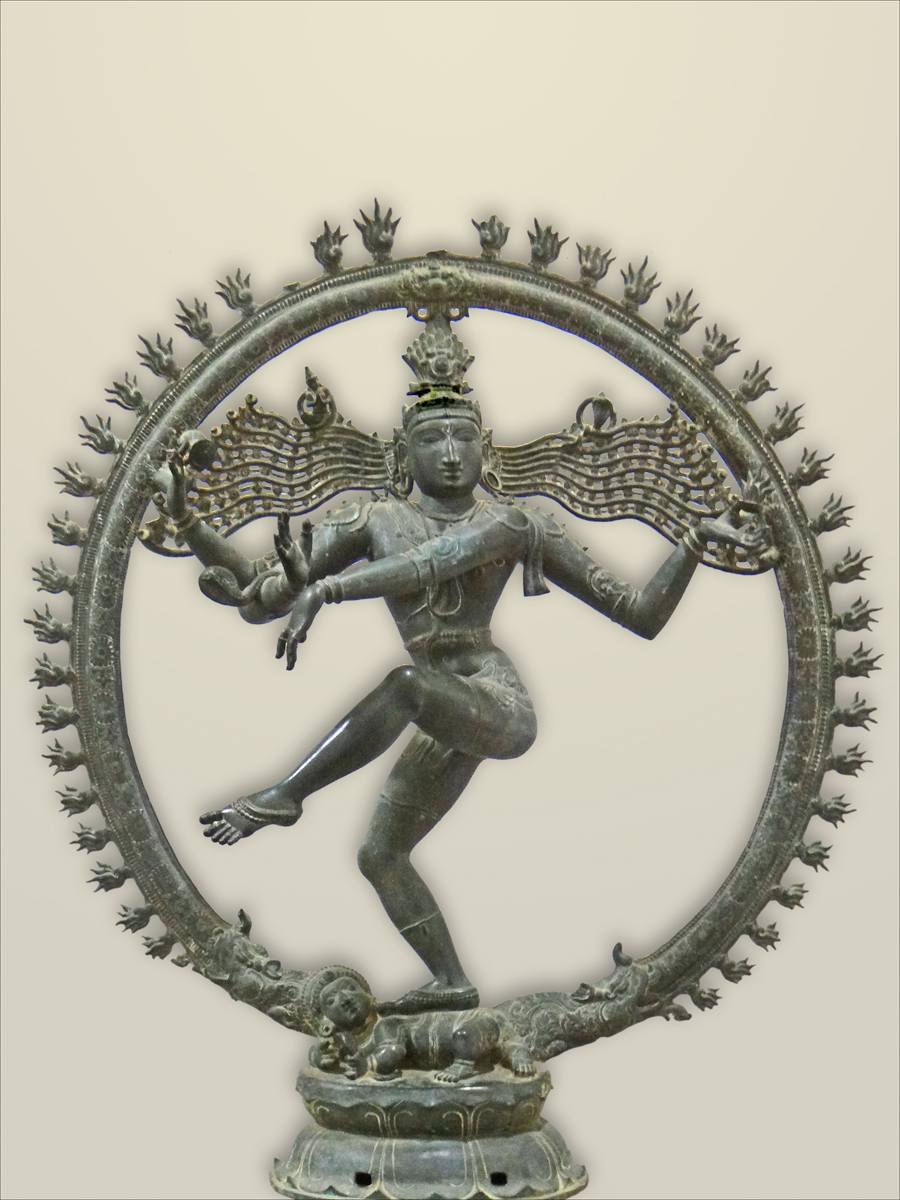
Rea's father named her after Nataraja (dancing Shiva).

In 2014, she wrote the foreword to Mark Stephens' third textbook on teaching yoga, Yoga Adjustments: Philosophy, Principles, and Techniques.

== Honors and distinctions ==
The author and yoga therapist Janice Gates honored Rea with a chapter of her 2006 book on women in yoga, Yoginis. Rea has contributed invited forewords to Mark Stephens's book Yoga Adjustments: Philosophy, Principles, and Techniques, to Alanna Kaivalya's book Myths of the Asanas: The Stories at the Heart of the Yoga Tradition, and to Lorin Roche's book The Radiance Sutras: 112 Gateways to the Yoga of Wonder and Delight.

She has been called one of America's leading yoga teachers. The Library Journal described Rea as a "big name" and a "well-established instructor", whose DVDs embodied the "highest production values". In 2009 she created Global Mala Day to coincide with the United Nations International Day of Peace. The Los Angeles Times described her as one of "yoga's rock stars", and her classes as feeling "more like a multicultural dance session".

In 2007 Vanity Fair called her "the Madonna of the yoga world" in a desert photo shoot; the photographer, Michael O'Neill portrayed her in Dancer pose (Natarajasana) wearing bikini briefs and an outsize bead necklace, with two tigers in a featureless flat landscape. The article said she was "the best-known instructor of Vinyasa flow yoga" and famous for "Yoga Trance Dance". It stated that she visits up to thirty-five countries every year on her teaching tours.

== Controversy ==
In 2017, Bizzie Gold of Buti Yoga published "An Open Letter to Shiva Rea", as a rebuttal to Shiva Rea's concerns about using Sanskrit words and yoga concepts for a fitness system claiming to be the "evolution of yoga" criticizing her claim to be teaching traditional yoga.

== Works ==
=== Books ===
- 1997 Hatha Yoga as a Practice of Embodiment, UCLA thesis
- 2014 Tending the Heart Fire: Living in Flow with the Pulse of Life. Sounds True. ISBN 978-1604077094

=== Videos ===
Shiva Rea has released a number of yoga DVDs through Gaiam, Soundstrue and Acacia.

Below is a chronological list of her major video releases:

- Prenatal Yoga: Mind • Body • Health (2000, Gaiam)
- Yoga Shakti (2004, Soundstrue)
- Lunar Flow Yoga (2005, Soundstrue)
- Fluid Power – Vinyasa Flow Yoga (2006, Acacia)
- Creative Core Abs (2007, Acacia)
- Yoga Trance Dance (2008, Acacia)
- Flow Yoga for Beginners (2008, Acacia)
- Daily Energy – Vinyasa Flow Yoga (2009, Acacia)
- Creative Core + Upper Body (2009, Acacia)
- Creative Core + Lower Body (2009, Acacia)
- Surf Yoga Soul (2010, Acacia)
- Radiant Heart Yoga (2010, Acacia)
- Yogini (2010, Acacia)
- A.M. Energy (2011, Acacia)
- More Daily Energy – Vinyasa Flow Yoga (2011, Acacia)
- Core Yoga (2012, Acacia)
- Mama and Baby Yoga (2012, Gaiam)
- Postnatal Yoga (2013, Acacia)
- Power Flow Yoga (2013, Acacia)
- Daily Energy Collection (2013, Acacia, compilation)
- Yoga in Greece (2013, Acacia)

== Sources ==
- Gates, Janice (2006). Yogini: Women Visionaries of the Yoga World. Mandala. ISBN 978-1932771886.
