= Judith Hanson Lasater =

American yoga teacher and writer

Judith Lasater
- Born: Judith Hanson Lasater; 8 March 1947 (age 79)
- Occupations: Yoga teacher, author
- Known for: Yoga Journal

Judith Lasater (born 8 March 1947) is an American yoga teacher and writer in the San Francisco Bay Area, recognized as one of the leading teachers in the country.

She helped to found The California Yoga Teachers Association, the Iyengar Yoga Institute in San Francisco, and Yoga Journal magazine. She is the author of numerous books on yoga practice and philosophy.

== Life ==
=== Early life ===
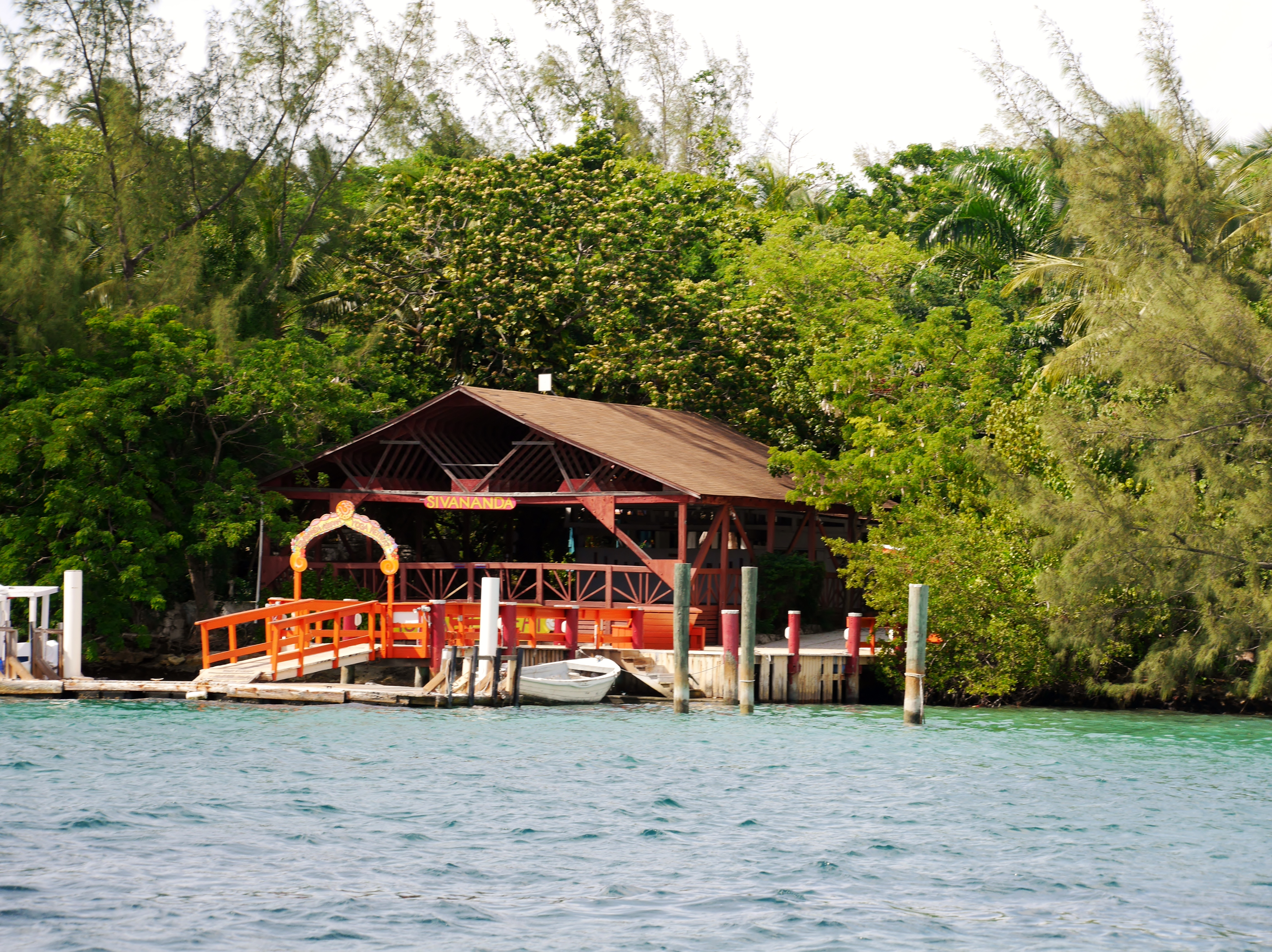
Despite being trained in Iyengar Yoga, Lasater took her honeymoon at the Sivananda Yoga Ashram in the Bahamas.

Lasater gained her bachelor's degree in physical therapy, and a doctorate in East-West psychology from the California Institute of Integral Studies, San Francisco. In 1970, while still a student, she developed arthritis and, feeling debilitated, began yoga at the YMCA in Austin, Texas. She stated that she instantly felt better, and has not suffered from arthritis since then. She began teaching yoga in 1971 when the YMCA instructor left, and she took over the class. She was an early disciple of B.K.S. Iyengar. To widen their knowledge, she and her husband Ike took their honeymoon in the Bahamas to attend Vishnudevananda's yoga teacher training course at the International Sivananda Yoga Ashram there.

=== Yoga teacher ===
She taught her yoga classes in the 1970s in a simple rented room, hanging a photograph of Iyengar on the wall. The journalist and historian of yoga in America, Stefanie Syman, writes that the key was doing away with all religious elements in her yoga teaching. In this way, she helped to popularize Iyengar Yoga in America, and was instrumental in creating the slow, gentle Restorative Yoga based on Iyengar-style asanas. She co-founded The California Yoga Teachers Association (CYTA) in 1974, and later became its president.

=== Founder of yoga institutions ===
Lasater co-founded the Iyengar Yoga Institute in San Francisco (it had been the CYTA's teacher training institute) and Yoga Journal magazine. With her husband and William Staniger, she published the 300 copies of the first issue of the journal, becoming its copy editor and later associate editor. She helped to make the journal accurate, technical, and with a strong emphasis on yoga's therapeutic value, continuing a tradition started by Indra Devi. In so doing, Lasater helped to bring about what Syman describes as a revolution, "wresting [yoga] back from the swamis", something that in Syman's view was possible only because of her teacher Iyengar's stubbornness, determination and knowledge. Syman states that Lasater went on to argue that physical yoga was sufficient, able in Lasater's words to absorb "elements of the other Yogas, such as Mental (Jnana) and Devotional (Bhakti) Yoga". She continues to serve on Yoga Journal's advisory boards, and is a regular presenter at its annual conference.

=== Leader of yoga in America ===
Lasater has been called "One of the [USA's] foremost [yoga] instructors", and a "yoga teaching star", having led workshops in 44 American states as well as in Australia, Bolivia, Canada, China, England, France, Indonesia, Japan, Mexico, New Zealand, Peru, and Russia. She has written numerous books on yoga; they have been translated into Chinese, French, German, Japanese, and Spanish.

The yoga therapist and teacher Janice Gates devoted a chapter of her book about women in yoga to her. Gates quotes Lasater as saying that the problem is always practitioners' attitude, not the practice itself; people in the West often seek an austere yoga in the hope of controlling their bodies, but, Lasater notes, "When the Buddha sought enlightenment, the 'austerity stage' is the first one he tried and the first one he dropped".

=== Family life ===
Lasater is married with three grown children.

== Works ==
- Relax and Renew: Restful Yoga for Stressful Times, Rodmell Press, 1995 (Co-authored with Mary Pullig Schatz), ISBN 0-9627138-4-8

— how to deal with stress in one's life, using Restorative Yoga, with advice on problems such as back pain, insomnia, and pregnancy

- Living Your Yoga: Finding the Spiritual in Everyday Life, Rodmell Press, 2000, ISBN 0-9627138-8-0

— how to bring the spiritual lessons from yoga into the challenging situations of daily life

- Yoga for Pregnancy: What Every Mom-to-Be Needs to Know, Rodmell Press, 2003, ISBN 1-930485-05-0

— short book on yoga poses and breathing for pregnant mothers

- 30 Essential Yoga Poses: For Beginning Students and Their Teachers, Rodmell Press, 2003, ISBN 1-930485-04-2

— a guide to practising and teaching yoga, explained through poses like Trikonasana, Vriksasana, and Virabhadrasana

- Yoga Abs: Moving From Your Core, Rodmell Press, 2005, ISBN 1-930485-09-3

— how to develop core strength in the abdominal muscles, using yoga

- A Year of Living Your Yoga: Daily Practices to Shape Your Life, Rodmell Press, 2006, ISBN 1-930485-15-8

— aphorisms and affirmations to accompany a yoga practice

- What We Say Matters: Practicing Nonviolent Communication, Rodmell Press, 2009 (Co-authored with Ike K. Lasater), ISBN 1-9304852-4-7

— advice and exercises for dealing with violence, using what Buddhism calls 'right speech'

- Yogabody: Anatomy, Kinesiology, and Asana, Rodmell Press, 2009, ISBN 978-1-930485-21-1

— deeper understanding of yoga through the relationship of asana practice to anatomy

- Restore and Rebalance: Yoga for Deep Relaxation, Shambhala, 2017, ISBN 978-1-611804-99-7

— using Restorative Yoga with new asanas to relax actively, using props such as chairs to rebalance body and mind

== Sources ==
- "California Yoga Teachers Association Board of Directors". Archived from the original on 23 August 2006.
- Gates, Janice (2006). Yogini: Women Visionaries of the Yoga World. Mandala. pp. 89–94. ISBN 978-1932771886.
- Hann, Joelle (23 August 2007). "Between Poses, a Barrage of Pickup Lines". The New York Times.
- Isaacs, Nora (5 April 2007). "Exercisers Slow It Down With Qigong". The New York Times.
- Kidston, Martin (25 November 2006). "Asana in Montana". Helena Independent Record.
- Lasater, Judith Hanson. "About Judith". Archived from the original on 2006-11-01.
- Powers, Ann (1 August 2000). "American Influences Help Redefine Practice of Yoga". The New York Times.
- Schneider, Carrie (2003). American Yoga: The Paths and Practices of America's Greatest Yoga Masters. Barnes & Noble. ISBN 978-0-7607-4558-8.
- Syman, Stefanie (2010). The Subtle Body: The Story of Yoga in America. New York: Farrar, Straus and Giroux. ISBN 978-0-374-23676-2.
- "au:Judith Hanson Lasater". WorldCat.
- "Yoga Journal Conference Presenters". Archived from the original on 23 October 2007.
