= Restorative Yoga =

Form of yoga as exercise

Restorative Yoga is the practice of asanas, each held for longer than in conventional yoga as exercise classes, often with the support of props such as folded blankets, to relax the body, reduce stress, and often to prepare for pranayama. The practice was foreshadowed by Iyengar Yoga's use of props in its deliberate style of asana practice.

== Practice ==
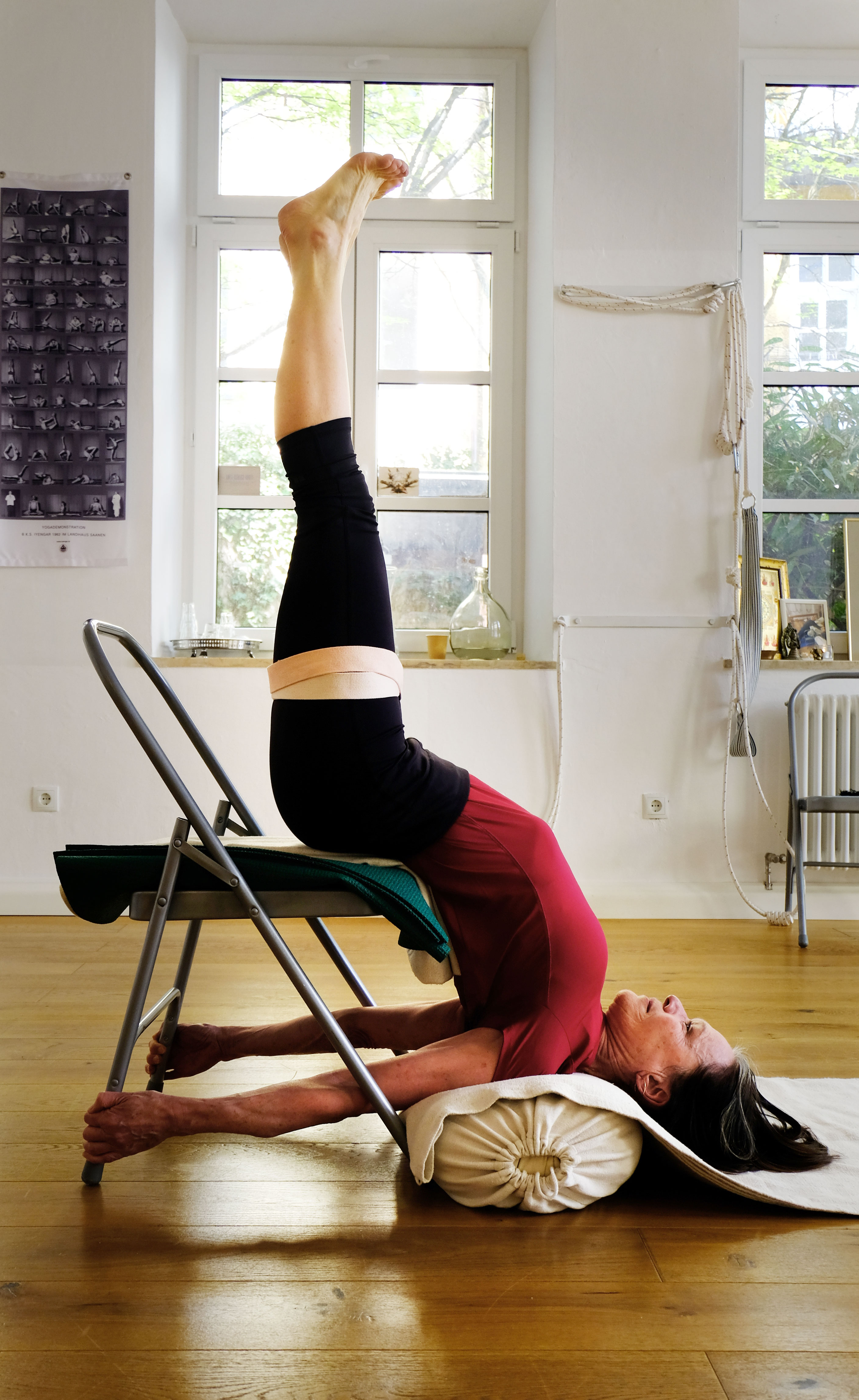
Sarvangasana in Restorative Yoga style, using a folding metal chair, a yoga mat, a long yoga belt, a blanket and a firm bolster

Restorative Yoga sessions allow the body to slow down and relax in a small number of asanas. Each pose is held for longer than in conventional classes, sometimes for twenty minutes, so a session may consist of only four to six asanas. The long holding of poses is often assisted with props such as folded blankets, blocks, and bolsters to ensure the body is fully supported and so to allow the muscles to relax.

An early disciple of B.K.S. Iyengar, the yoga teacher and Yoga Journal editor Judith Lasater helped to popularize restorative yoga, based on Iyengar Yoga's asanas and use of props. Lasater states that "you will need" a yoga mat, four yoga blocks, three firm bolsters, three hand towels, three eye bags, eight firm blankets, a broad 6 feet (1.8 m) long yoga belt, a folding metal chair with the front rung removed, and two 10 pounds (4.5 kg) sandbags. For home practice, she suggests substituting throw pillows, couch cushions, or large bags of rice or dry beans as improvised props.

Lasater proposes twelve asanas and their variants, for a total of twenty poses, with detailed instructions that occupy much of her 2017 book Restore and Rebalance. The poses are reclining or supported variants of Baddha Konasana (Butterfly pose; Balasana (child's pose);Uttanasana (forward fold);Downward Dog; Prasarita Padottanasana (wide-legged forward bend); Urdhva Dhanurasana (upward bow); Setu Bandhasana (bridge); legs up the wall; Sarvangasana (shoulderstand); Halasana (plough); Urdhva Paschimottanasana (upward-facing forward bend); and Shavasana (corpse pose).

Restorative yoga is not a fancy way of taking a nap nor is it stretching, which can easily become another way to generate craving, which is definitely not relaxing. Instead of doing yoga, this form of yoga does us. Restorative asana practice provides a framework for openings of body, breath, and mind to occur naturally over time, without tightening, stretching, or collapsing.

— Cyndi Lee, Yoga Body, Buddha Mind

The yoga teacher Cyndi Lee suggests a short sequence of six asanas, all with the use of supports: reclining bound angle pose (Supta Baddha Konasana), legs up the wall (Viparita Karani), a prone twist with both knees to one side (Jathara Parivartanasana), a sitting forward bend (Paschimottanasana), child's pose, and corpse pose, with or without supports).

Lee links the need for Restorative Yoga to the stress of modern life and the resulting habitual state of fight-or-flight, appropriate to emergencies but harmful when chronic. The biological response involves the hormone adrenaline signalling emergency, raising blood pressure, heart rate, and muscle tension, while resources are diverted from the digestive and reproductive systems, and from processes of cell growth and tissue repair; Restorative Yoga can in her view help to reverse that process. Lee describes yoga relaxation as combining the active quality of standing to attention in Tadasana with the passive quality of lying down like a corpse in Shavasana. The combination offers in her view a middle path, receptiveness.

== Reception ==
Geraldine Beirne, writing in The Guardian, called Restorative Yoga "all about healing the mind and body through simple poses often held for as long as 20 minutes, with the help of props such as bolsters, pillows and straps".

The martial arts coach Eric C. Stevens, stating that he found being still more difficult than a "five mile run", was surprised to start the Restorative Yoga class with Shavasana, and to see so many props in use - blanket, pillow, eye bag, strap, blocks. He found his mind strongly challenged during the class, and he slept very soundly afterwards. He recommended the practice for people who feel close to burnout.

== Comparison with Yin Yoga ==
Restorative Yoga is mainly for practitioners suffering from injuries, stress, or illness, who therefore require a yoga practice that can bring them back to a better quality of life; classes are necessarily small so that each person can receive detailed attention to ensure they are safe and properly supported. Yin Yoga uses props in a similar way, and holds poses for similarly long periods, but is aimed mainly at healthy practitioners, and is taught in larger classes. The teacher trainer Jillian Pransky, writing in Yoga Journal, likens Restorative Yoga to Yin Yoga or to a meditative practice rather than the more "yang" yoga styles of energetic movement practice. As such, in her view, it helps practitioners to find where they are holding tension in their body.

== See also ==
- Yoga as therapy
- Restorative yoga props

== Sources ==
- Gates, Janice (2006). Yogini: Women Visionaries of the Yoga World. Mandala. pp. 89–94. ISBN 978-1932771886.
- Lasater, Judith (1995). Relax and renew : restful yoga for stressful times. Rodmell Press. ISBN 978-0-9627138-4-2. OCLC 33388596.
- Lasater, Judith (2017). Restore and Rebalance: Yoga for Deep Relaxation. Shambhala. ISBN 978-1-61180-499-7. OCLC 975032763.
- Lee, Cyndi (2004). Yoga Body, Buddha Mind. Riverhead Books. ISBN 978-1-59448-024-9.
