= Cyndi Lee =

American Mindful Yoga teacher

Cyndi Lee is a teacher of mindful yoga, a combination of Tibetan Buddhist practice and yoga as exercise. She has an international reputation and is the author of several books on her approach and runs her business from New York City.

== Biography ==
=== Early life ===
Cyndi Lee was born in Seattle; her father was a protestant minister; her mother was a tailor and ceramicist. She was educated at Chapman College, California, starting in 1971. She gained her MFA at University of California, Irvine, with a thesis on "Women, Spirituality and Indian Dance". She won an Art History Fellowship to the Whitney Museum of American Art in New York and started to teach yoga around 1980 in Greenwich Village, working also as a choreographer of music videos.

=== Career ===
Lee states that her "root guru" was the Tibetan master Gelek Rimpoche, from the late 1980s. She began teaching meditation by 1990. She trained as a lay Buddhist chaplain under Roshi Joan Halifax at Upaya Zen Center in 2013, and was ordained in 2018. Influenced by yoga teachers Sharon Gannon, Rodney Yee and B. K. S. Iyengar, she founded the OM yoga centre in New York City in 1998, closing it in 2012. She runs teacher training courses in meditation and restorative yoga. She runs workshops and trainings across America including at Kripalu, and in Europe at venues such as London's Triyoga.

She has published five books on yoga and Buddhism, and writes for magazines including Yoga Journal, where she began its "Vinyasa/Home Practice" column, Real Simple, and Lion's Roar.

== Reception ==
The yoga and meditation teacher and author Anne Cushman, reviewing Yoga Body, Buddha Mind for Tricycle: The Buddhist Review, writes that Lee's book was the most readable of the three mindful yoga works she was reviewing. Cushman states that "Lee is well known as both an inspiring teacher and a good storyteller, and has a wide following from her books, retreats, and Om Yoga in a Box practice kits."

Kathleen Kraft, interviewing Lee for Yoga International, writes that Lee had been a featured teacher on the site, and was "not afraid to reinvent herself". She describes Lee as an "influential and soulful yoga teacher".

Nirmala Nataraj, in Yogi Times, calls Lee's combination of Hatha Yoga and Tibetan Buddhism "a unique way to explore yoga's discipline".

Susanna Smith, reviewing OM Yoga in a Box for VideoFitness.com, found the package of audio and practical materials an excellent deal, containing "very doable" exercises with "much less woo woo than Yoga Chants by Shiva Rea".

== Works ==
=== Books ===
- 2003 OM at home (Chronicle Books)
- 2004 OM yoga today (Chronicle Books)
- 2004 Yoga Body, Buddha Mind (Riverhead Books)
- 2013 May I Be Happy: A Memoir of Love, Yoga, and Changing My Mind (Plume Books)
- 2017 (with Ruthie Fraser) Stack your bones (The Experiment)
- 2019 (with Sage Rountree and Alexandra Desiato) Teaching Yoga Beyond the Poses (North Atlantic Books)

=== Self-instruction ===
- 2003 OM Yoga in a Box (instructional CD, music CD, yoga strap, incense and holder, tea candle, set of asana flash cards) (Hay House, ISBN 978-1561709731)
