= Indra Devi =

Yoga teacher (1899–2002)

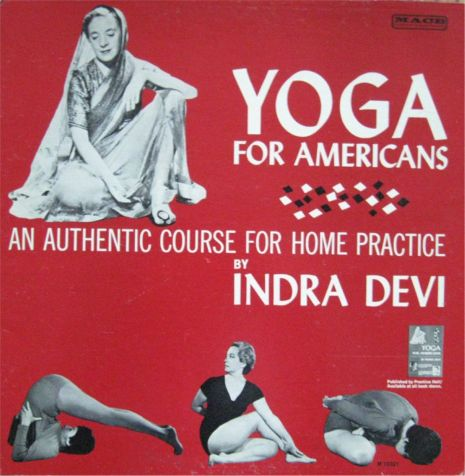
- Indra Devi, upper left, in her distinctive sari; 1963 album cover
- Born: Eugenie Peterson; 12 May 1899; Riga, Governorate of Livonia, Russian Empire
- Died: 25 April 2002 (aged 102); Buenos Aires, Argentina
- Occupation: Yoga teacher
- Known for: Bringing yoga to Hollywood; Yoga for stress relief
- Spouse(s): Jan Strakaty (1930–1946; his death); Sigfrid Knauer (1953–1984; his death)
- Website: Official webpage (in Spanish)

Eugenie Peterson (Latvian: Eiženija Pētersone, Russian: Евгения Васильевна Петерсон, romanized: Yevgeniya Vasilyevna Peterson; (Note: In this name that follows East Slavic naming customs, the patronymic is Vasilyevna and the family name is Peterson.) 12 May 1899 – 25 April 2002), known as Indra Devi, was a pioneering teacher of yoga as exercise, and an early disciple of Tirumalai Krishnamacharya, the "father of modern yoga".

She went to India in her twenties, becoming a film star there and acquiring the stage name Indra Devi. She was the first woman to study under the yoga guru Krishnamacharya at the Mysore Palace, alongside B.K.S Iyengar and K. Pattabhi Jois who went on to become yoga gurus. Moving to China, she taught the first yoga classes in that country at the house of Soong Mei-ling, wife of Chiang Kai-shek.

Her popularization of yoga in America through her many celebrity pupils in Hollywood, and her books advocating yoga for stress relief, earned her the nickname "first lady of yoga". Her biographer, Michelle Goldberg, wrote that Devi "planted the seeds for the yoga boom of the 1990s".

== Early years ==
Eugenie "Zhenya" Peterson was born on 12 May 1899 in Riga in the Russian Empire (now Latvia), to Vasili Peterson, a Swedish bank director, and Aleksandra Labunskaya, a Russian noblewoman who acted at the Nezlobina Theatre. Eugenie was given a Russian Orthodox baptism. She went to high school in Saint Petersburg, graduating with a gold medal in 1917. She briefly attended drama school in Moscow. In the Russian Revolution, her father served as an army officer and went missing in action in the civil war. Eugenie and her mother escaped to Latvia as the Bolsheviks came to power in 1917, losing the family fortune; in 1920 they moved to Poland, and in 1921 to Berlin, where she became an actress and dancer.

In 1926, attracted by a notice in a bookshop in Tallinn, she went to hear Jiddu Krishnamurti at a Theosophical Society meeting in the Netherlands; his chanting of Sanskrit mantras around a campfire had a powerful effect on her. She later said "It seemed to me, I was hearing a forgotten call, familiar, but distant. From that day everything in me turned upside down."

== Career ==
=== India ===
Devi's fascination with India began at 15 when she read a book by poet-philosopher Rabindranath Tagore and a yoga instruction book by Yogi Ramacharaka. In Berlin, she worked as an actor in The Blue Bird, touring Europe, and accepted a proposal of marriage from the banker Herman Bolm, on condition she could first go to India; he agreed and paid for the trip. She set off on 17 November 1927, crossing India from south to north, wearing a sari for the first time, sitting on the floor and eating with her fingers. She came back three months later, a changed woman, speaking only of India, and returned Bolm's engagement ring. She soon went back to India, selling her valuables to pay for the trip. At the Theosophical Society in Adyar (Madras, now Chennai), dancing "an Indian temple dance", she met Jawaharlal Nehru, starting a long-term friendship, and the Indian film director Bhagwati Mishra, who gave her a part in Sher-e-Arab (Arabian Knight): the 1930 premiere made her a film star in India, under a new stage name, Indra Devi. In 1930, she married Jan Strakaty, a commercial attaché to the Czechoslovak consulate in Bombay, and for some years lived as a society hostess there.

She became interested in yoga, Nepal's prince Mussoorie showing her some asanas, and she was impressed by the yoga guru Krishnamacharya's demonstration of apparently stopping his heart. She asked to study with him; in 1938, he reluctantly accepted her as a student after his employer, the Maharaja of Mysore, spoke on her behalf. She was obliged to keep to the strict vegetarian diet and the monastic hours, with lights out at 9pm. She was the first foreign woman among his students in the yogasala in the Mysore Palace, studying alongside B.K.S Iyengar and K. Pattabhi Jois who went on to become world-famous yoga teachers. When she was leaving India to follow her husband to China, Krishnamacharya asked her to work as a yoga teacher there.

=== China ===
In 1939, she held what are believed to be the first yoga classes in China and opened a school in Shanghai at the house of Soong Mei-ling, wife of the nationalist leader Chiang Kai-shek, and a yoga as exercise enthusiast. The classes began with 20 minutes of relaxation in shavasana, followed by bridge, shoulderstand, gentle backbends such as cobra pose, lotus position (including leaning right forward into Yogamudrasana), and headstand, against a wall for beginners. There were many Americans and Russians among her pupils; she also taught free classes in orphanages. More and more people began to call her Mataji, which means "respected mother".

=== India and China ===
Her husband died unexpectedly in 1946, and Devi returned to India, arriving in Bombay as the British Raj was coming to an end. She was hosted by the maharajah of Tehri Garhwal at his palace in the Himalayas. She was hoping to stay in Kashmir to teach yoga in a centre to be run by the Cambodian monk Bellong Mahathera, but her mother called her back to Shanghai, where Devi's house was being requisitioned by the army in the Chinese Civil War. Devi arrived there in time to sell many of her possessions before the house was taken over. She claimed later that she had wanted to return to India, but she obtained a United States visa, and sailed on the troopship USS General W. H. Gordon to San Francisco at the end of 1947.

=== United States ===
(left to right) Harry Lehrer, Jean R. Miller, Anne T. Hill, Indra Devi in Los Angeles in 1965

In California, assisted by her experience as a diplomat's wife with a patrician manner and the natural confidence of the wealthy, she met the author and philosopher Aldous Huxley and Krishnamurti, giving her access to spiritually-inclined Americans; an especially valuable contact was the diet and health guru Paul Bragg, who advised film and stage stars. In 1948 she opened a yoga studio at 8806 Sunset Boulevard in Hollywood, the first in Los Angeles; she had a distinctive style and appearance, as she normally wore a sari. Her friends Magaña and Walt Baptiste opened a yoga school in San Francisco in 1952; she became godmother to their son Baron Baptiste, who went on to found Baron Baptiste Power Yoga.

Devi taught her own form of hatha yoga, with asanas (postures) and pranayama (breath control); she avoided spiritual teaching, which she preferred to leave to yoga gurus. Her teaching style was in Stefanie Syman's words "gentle and even relaxing". She was almost immediately successful in attracting leading stars, including men as well as women; Syman notes that "she could charm the pants off men". Elliott Goldberg gives a different explanation for her success, attributing it to her packaging of yoga for women as a "beauty secret, youth elixir, and health tonic". More generally, in his view, Devi saw yoga as a remedy for anxiety and stress, noting that this transformed yoga from something that dissolved the ego to something that strengthened it, because, he commented, Americans did want to change "but not all that much". Devi's advocacy of yoga for stress relief contributed, in Goldberg's view, to the widespread acceptance of yoga in America, and earned her the nickname "first lady of yoga".

She taught yoga to many celebrities including Greta Garbo, Eva Gabor, and Gloria Swanson. (Note: But not Marilyn Monroe, contrary to popular belief. While Monroe did own her bestselling book Forever Young, Forever Healthy, there is no proof that the two women met. A popular photo that shows Eva Gabor training with Devi in 1960 is commonly mistaken for Monroe. Monroe posed for glamour photographs in postures close to Navasana and Dhanurasana, but again there is no evidence that she learnt these from yoga rather than Western gymnastics.) Also among her students were Ramon Novarro, Robert Ryan, Yul Brynner, Jennifer Jones, and the violinist Yehudi Menuhin, who brought Iyengar to the West.

Her books, including the 1953 Forever Young, Forever Healthy and the 1959 Yoga for Americans described a gentle, relaxing style of yoga using a small number of asanas, (Note: Devi taught only 12 asanas, apart from Surya Namaskar (Sun Salutation); they included Bhujangasana, Viparita Karani, Lotus pose, Yogamudrasana and Shirshasana.) practised slowly. Devi's biographer, Michelle Goldberg, describes Yoga for Americans as having "a chipper, secular practicality perfectly calibrated for Eisenhower's America." Devi introduced the book as of value to artists, "businessmen and sportsmen, models and housewives" and office workers. Menuhin wrote the foreword. The two books were "an enormous success", and were translated into languages including French, German, Italian, Japanese, Portuguese, and Spanish.

In 1953 Devi married the German anthroposophical physician Sigfrid Knauer. In the mid-1950s she was granted American citizenship and changed her legal name to Indra Devi. In 1960 she visited the USSR, seeing Saint Petersburg (then Leningrad) for the first time in 40 years, and meeting the government ministers Andrei Gromyko and Alexei Kosygin at the Indian ambassador's reception at the Sovetskaya Hotel. Devi released several vinyl records, including Yoga for Americans (1965) and Indra Devi presents Concentration & Meditation (1965). She later recorded several instructional talks on yoga, including "Renew Your Life with Yoga."

=== Latin America ===
In 1961, Knauer bought Devi a large ranch in Tecate in Mexico; she opened the Indra Devi Foundation there. From 1966, she became close to the Hindu guru Sathya Sai Baba, and she travelled often from Tecate to Bangalore and Puttaparthi. She closed the Tecate operation in 1977 and moved with her very ill husband to Bangalore. In 1984 she and Knauer made a trip to Sri Lanka, where he died.

In 1985 she moved to Argentina. In 1987 she was elected president of honour of the International Yoga Federation, and of the Latin American Union of Yoga under the presidency of Swami Maitreyananda at Montevideo, Uruguay. She died in Buenos Aires in 2002.

== Legacy ==
Biographer Michelle Goldberg comments that for most of her life, Devi's "only goal" was to bring yoga to the West, and when it became "a ubiquitous part of cosmopolitan urban culture, signifier of a lifestyle at once wholesome and sexy" in the 1990s, she had certainly succeeded, even if the new yoga is "much more vigorous than the style she taught".

Yoga remains, Goldberg writes, as Devi had made it, a predominantly female pursuit, despite the energetic workouts of Power Yoga; she created the link in the Western mind between yoga and organic food, "holistic spas, and biodynamic beauty products". Goldberg notes that yoga in the West is "a hybrid culture", with "an immense gulf between the limber young women in Lululemon yoga gear ... and the ash-smeared half-naked yogins .. on the banks of the Ganges".

== Works ==
- Devi, Indra (1953). Forever Young, Forever Healthy: Simplified Yoga for Modern Living. Prentice-Hall. OCLC 652377847.
- Devi, Indra (1959). Yoga For Americans: A Complete 6 Week Course for Home Practice. Prentice-Hall. OCLC 779004518.
- Devi, Indra (1963). Renew your life through yoga. The Indra Devi method for relaxation through rhythmic breathing. Prentice-Hall. OCLC 877363243.
- Devi, Indra (2000). Una mujer de tres siglos (in Spanish). Buenos Aires: Sudmericana. ISBN 978-950-07-1726-7. OCLC 48372297.

== See also ==
- Yoga in Russia
- Yoga in the United States

== Sources ==
- Fedorov, Anton (1 October 2010). "Поставившая мир на голову" [Turn the world on its head]. Vokrug sveta (in Russian) (October 2010). An authorised English version of the article is available on the Wild Yogi website.
- Goldberg, Elliott (2016). The Path of Modern Yoga : the history of an embodied spiritual practice. Rochester, Vermont: Inner Traditions. pp. 338–363. ISBN 978-1-62055-567-5.
- Goldberg, Michelle (2016) [2015]. The Goddess Pose: The Audacious Life of Indra Devi, The Woman Who Helped Bring Yoga to the West. London: Corsair. ISBN 978-1-4721-5204-6. OCLC 927383820.
- Syman, Stefanie (2010). The Subtle Body: The Story of Yoga in America. New York: Farrar, Straus, and Giroux. pp. 179-197. ISBN 978-0-374-23676-2.
