= Rama Jyoti Vernon =

Rama Jyoti Vernon (January 4, 1941 – November 23, 2020) was a yoga teacher and peace activist. She was a co-founder of Yoga Journal, and of the California Yoga Teachers Association. She is considered one of America's yoga pioneers and was one of the first yoga teachers in the USA.

Her mother, a student of Yogananda took her to her first yoga class at age 15. As an adult, Vernon was one of the early students of B.K.S. Iyengar in North America and hosted him on his first visit to California in 1973. Vernon founded the American Yoga College.

She also founded the organization Unity in Yoga International, which eventually evolved into the Yoga Alliance and which sponsored seven national and three international conferences under Vernon's direction, including the Soviet-American Yoga Conference in Moscow in October 1990. The founders of The International Association of Yoga Therapists, Richard Miller and Larry Payne, acknowledged Vernon's contribution to the creation of the association though the connections she fostered at the Unity in Yoga conferences.

Vernon established the Center for Soviet-American Dialogue in 1984 to help connect the citizens of the United States with those of the Soviet Union during the Cold War. She served as a citizen diplomat, bringing groups of ordinary people to dialogue across borders, and even appeared on a Soviet morning show. She later simplified the name of her organization to the Center for International Dialogue and expanded its reach into the Middle East, visiting Jordan, the West Bank and Gaza with American citizens.
