= Gurmukh Kaur Khalsa =

American yoga teacher (born 1942 or 1943)

- Born: Mary May Gibson; 1942/1943; Downers Grove, Illinois, U.S.
- Education: San Francisco State University
- Occupations: Co-founder and director of Golden Bridge Yoga, Los Angeles and New York
- Known for: Kundalini yoga, yoga in pregnancy
- Spouse: Gurushabd Singh Khalsa (m. 1982)
- Children: 1
- Website: goldenbridgeyoga.com khalsaway.com

Gurmukh Kaur Khalsa (née Mary May Gibson; born 1942/1943) is a teacher of Kundalini yoga, as taught by Yogi Bhajan, and a pioneer in the field of pre-natal yoga. She is the co-founder and director of the Golden Bridge Yoga Center in Los Angeles, and the author of two books and three DVDs. She has become a yoga guru for Hollywood film stars.

== Early years ==
Mary May Gibson was born in a small Illinois town, to middle-class, Methodist parents. At age nineteen, she left her home to attend college at San Francisco State University in California. There, she married a Ph.D. student, and in 1964, gave birth to a boy with a congenital heart defect. The child died seven months later, and the marriage ended in an amicable divorce. From living in Haight Ashbury, Gibson traveled to Big Sur, then to Mexico, where she lived among tribal peoples. She subsequently resided in Maui.

Gibson later moved to a Zen Buddhist zendō, where she practiced silent meditation seven hours a day for a year.

== Introduction to Kundalini yoga ==
In 1970, Gibson and a colleague went to the 3HO ashram in Tucson, Arizona. She stayed in Arizona for two years, working at the ashram, and taught yoga at the University of Arizona as well as at the Arizona State Correctional Facility. It was in 1970, at the ashram, that she met Yogi Bhajan, a Kundalini yoga master. On their first meeting, he gave Gibson a new name, "Gurmukh", meaning "the one whose face is towards the guru (meaning they have dedicated their lives to their guru)". He also told her she would help deliver babies. She then worked in the field of home births with a Santa Fe obstetrician/gynecologist, after which teaching yoga became her full-time occupation.

== Yoga for pregnant mothers ==
In 1977, Gurmukh went on a pilgrimage to India, and on her return, moved to Los Angeles, where she met Gurushabd Singh Khalsa, whom she married on September 29, 1982, aged 39. In February 1982, she gave birth to their daughter, at home, with the help of a midwife. Thereafter, Gurmukh used her knowledge of Kundalini yoga, as taught by Yogi Bhajan, and her own pregnancy experiences, to give classes for expectant mothers. This eventually led to a childbirth education program she was to call "the Khalsa Way", which included her own pre- and post-natal videos. She also began a sixty-hour Khalsa Way teacher training certification course for women from around the world to take to their communities. In 2003, Gurmukh published the book Bountiful, Beautiful, Blissful: Exploring the Natural Power of Pregnancy and Birth with Kundalini Yoga and Meditation, through St. Martin's Press.

== Kundalini yoga ==
In her career as a Kundalini yoga teacher based in Los Angeles, Gurmukh developed a celebrity clientele, which included Madonna, Courtney Love, Gwyneth Paltrow, David Duchovny, Annette Bening, and Rosanna Arquette. Eventually, with the guidance of her teacher, Gurmukh Kaur stopped offering private classes to celebrities.

In 2000, she published the guide Eight Human Talents: The Yoga Way to Restore the Balance and Serenity Within You through HarperCollins. In 2002, Gurmukh and Gurutej Kaur co-founded the Golden Bridge Yoga Center in Los Angeles, where she and her husband teach classes and workshops. They also offer teacher trainings around the world.

In 2007, Vanity Fair described Gurmukh as the "glamour girl of Kundalini".

== Publications ==
- Gurmukh Kaur Khalsa, Eight Human Talents: The Yoga Way to Restore the Balance and Serenity Within You, New York, Harper Collins, 2000.
- Gurmukh Kaur Khalsa, Bountiful, Beautiful, Blissful: Exploring the Natural Power of Pregnancy and Birth with Kundalini Yoga and Meditation, New York, St. Martins Griffin, 2003.

== DVDs ==
- Prenatal Kundalini Yoga and meditation for mothers-to-be, Gaiam (2000)
- Postnatal Kundalini Yoga for new mothers, Gaiam (2000)
- Kundalini Yoga with Gurmukh, Living Arts (2004)

== Articles ==
- Joanne Chen, "Spiritual Love," Vogue, April 1999.
- Anna Dubrovsky, "Kundalini's Queen: Gurmukh Kaur Khalsa", Yoga International
- Samantha Dunn, "L.A. (Yoga) Story", Yoga Journal, July–August 1999
- Julie Deife, "Sitting Down with Gurmukh", LA Yoga Magazine, January–February 2005
- Janice Gates (2006). Yogini: Women Visionaries of the Yoga World. San Rafael, California: Mandala Publications. pp. 82–87. ISBN 978-1-932771-88-6.
- Marcy Axness; Melanie Mayo (August 8, 2013). "Gurmukh's Postpartum Wisdom". Mothering.
