= Geeta Iyengar =

Indian yoga instructor

- Born: 7 December 1944
- Died: 16 December 2018 (aged 74)
- Occupations: Yoga author and teacher
- Known for: Yoga for women
- Father: B. K. S. Iyengar

Geeta S. Iyengar (7 December 1944 – 16 December 2018), the eldest daughter of Yogacharya B. K. S. Iyengar, was a yoga teacher credited with advancing yoga for women.

== Life and work ==
Geeta Iyengar, eldest daughter of the founder of the worldwide Iyengar yoga method, Yogacharya B. K. S. Iyengar, was described as "the world's leading female yoga teacher".

Iyengar studied yoga with her father from an early age. After graduating high school in 1961, she began substituting for her father when he was away on international teaching tours. When he retired in 1984, she became co-director, with her brother Prashant S. Iyengar, of the Ramamani Iyengar Memorial Yoga Institute (RIMYI) as well as undertaking her own international teaching tours.

== Teaching ==
Iyengar adapted her father's method of yoga to the specific requirements of women. Specific asanas, pranayama and sequences are given for different stages in a woman's life including menstruation, pregnancy, postpartum, and menopause. Like her father, Iyengar explained how yoga is used as a method to unify body and mind, and strengthen the respiratory system, circulatory system, nervous system, muscles, epidermis, and the mind.

In addition to teaching at RIMYI, Iyengar periodically toured worldwide to carry on the Iyengar Yoga lineage. She was a well-known figure in yoga around the world, in North America, Australia, South Africa, and Europe.

She trained yoga teachers around the world, for example in Italy. She died on 16 December 2018, two days after her father's birth centenary, aged 74. She was unwell and used a wheelchair for more than a year. She had said that she would not depart this earth until she had completed her father's 100th birth anniversary celebration.

== Publications ==
- Iyengar, Geeta. Yoga: A Gem for Women, 2002. ISBN 978-0-931454-98-1
- Iyengar, Geeta. Yoga in Action – Preliminary Course, 2000. ISBN 978-81-87603-01-6
- Iyengar, Geeta. Yoga in Action - Intermediate Course-I, 2013. ISBN 978-81-87603-22-1
- Clennell, Bobby; Iyengar, Geeta. The Women's Yoga Book: Asana and Pranayama for All Phases of the Menstrual Cycle, 2007. ISBN 978-1-930485-18-1
- Iyengar, Geeta. Iyengar Yoga for Motherhood: Safe Practice for Expectant & New Mothers, 2010. ISBN 978-1-402726-89-7
