= Shavasana =

Relaxed reclining posture in hatha yoga

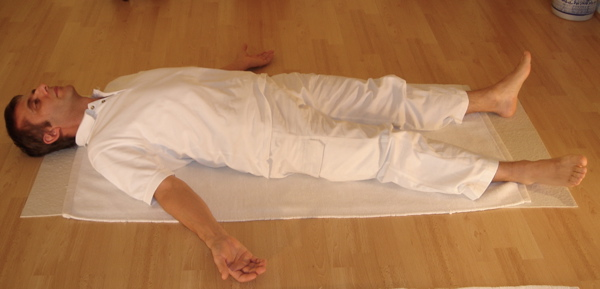
Shavasana

Shavasana (Sanskrit: शवासन; IAST: śavāsana), Corpse Pose, or Mritasana, is an asana in hatha yoga and modern yoga as exercise, often used for relaxation at the end of a session. It is the usual pose for the practice of yoga nidra meditation, and is an important pose in Restorative Yoga.

== Etymology and origins ==
The name Shavasana is from Sanskrit शव Śava, "corpse" and आसन Āsana, "posture" or "seat". The alternative name Mritasana is from Sanskrit मृत mṛta, "death". The earliest mention of the pose is in the 15th-century Hatha Yoga Pradipika 1.32, which states in the context of a medieval belief system that "lying down on the ground supine, like a corpse, is called Shavasana. It eliminates tiredness and promotes calmness of the mind."

The name Supta Padangusthasana is from Sanskrit सुप्त पादाङ्गुष्ठासन supta pādāṅguṣṭhāsana, from सुप्त supta, "reclined" and पादाङ्गुष्ठ pādāṅguṣṭha, "big toe". The pose is not described in medieval hatha yoga texts, but appears in the 20th century; it is pose 27 in Ashtanga Vinyasa Yoga's primary series.

The name Pavanamuktasana (Sanskrit: पवनमुक्तासन, romanized: Pavanamuktāsana) is from Sanskrit पवन pavana, "wind" and मुक्त mukta, "free". The pose is unknown in medieval hatha yoga, appearing in the 20th century, for example as one of the set poses in the basic sequence of Bikram Yoga.

== Description ==
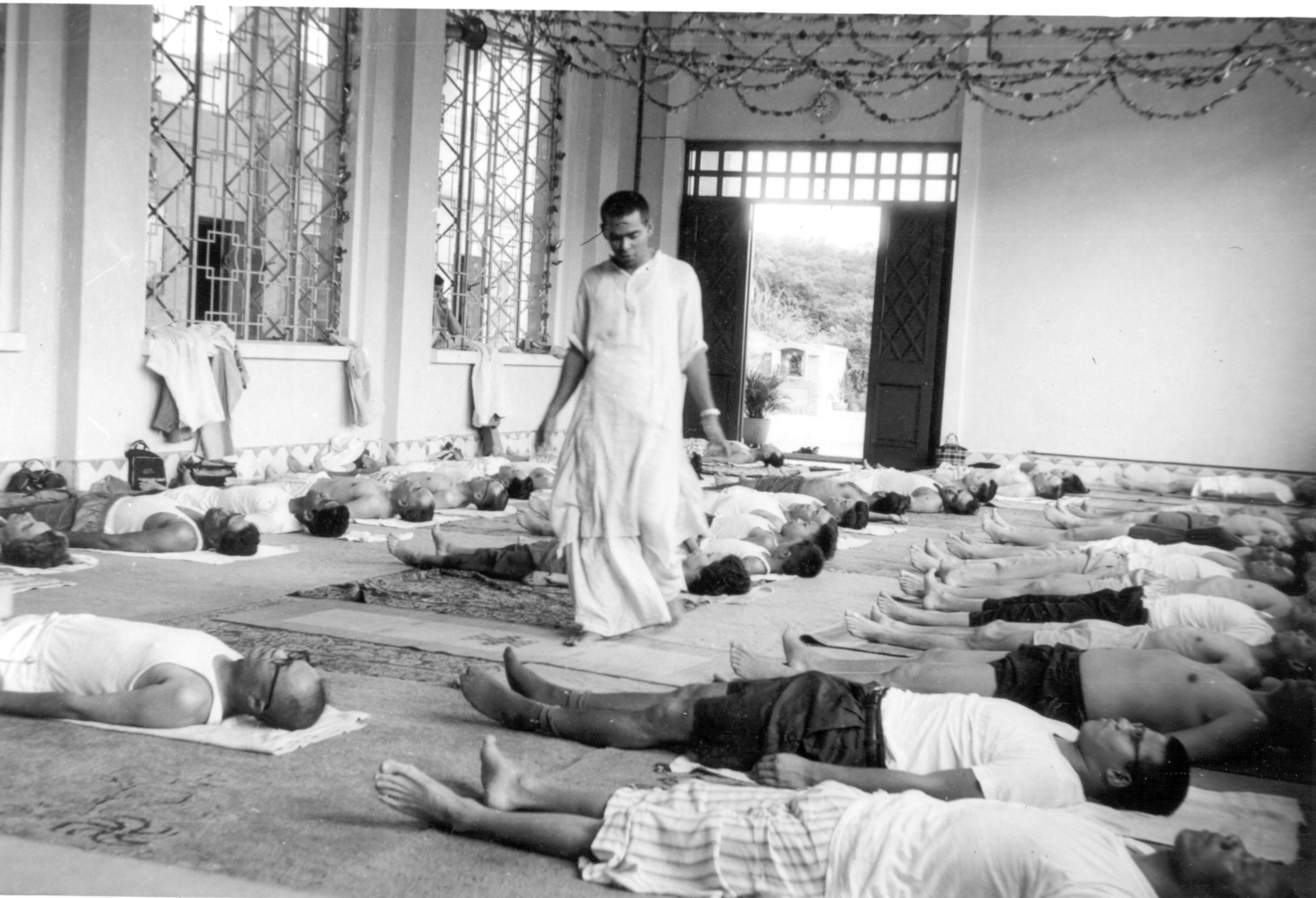
Vishnudevananda with a Sivananda yoga class relaxing in Shavasana

Shavasana and some sitting asanas maintain the balance between relaxation and meditation (two key components of yoga) by their equal input of physical stimuli.

Shavasana is performed on the back with the legs spread as wide as the yoga mat and arms relaxed to both the sides of the body, and the eyes closed. The whole body is relaxed on the floor with an awareness of the chest and abdomen rising and falling with each breath. During Shavasana, all parts of the body are scanned for muscular tension of any kind. Any muscular tension the body finds is consciously released as it is found. All control of the breath, the mind, and the body is then released for the duration of the asana. Shavasana is typically practiced for 5–10 minutes at the end of an asana practice, but can be practiced for 20–30 minutes. In Sivananda yoga, it is practised not only for "Final Relaxation" at the end of a session, but before the session and between asanas.

The asana is released by slowly deepening the breath, flexing the fingers and toes, reaching the arms above the head, stretching the whole body, and exhaling while bringing the knees to the chest and rolling over to the side in a fetal position, drawing the head in the right arm. From here, one can push up into a seated position. Drowsiness or restlessness of the mind while in Shavasana may be counteracted by increasing the rate and depth of breathing. While in Shavasana, it is important to be in a neutral position.

== Variations ==
Shavasana can be modified by bending the knees, keeping the feet hip-width apart, to allow people with low back pain to recline comfortably. The variation can also be used by practitioners who find it hard to relax when lying flat.

Supta Padangusthasana ("Reclining Hand to Big Toe pose") is entered from Shavasana by raising one leg and optionally grasping the big toe with the hand on the same side. A variant is to turn the leg outwards and allow it to sink towards the ground, keeping the hip and trunk level. Another variant, possible only with supple hamstrings, is to bring the raised leg forwards over the face, raising the head to touch the leg, and stretching the arm that is grasping the big toe back and up over the shoulder. If the back is stiff or the hamstrings are tight, a belt held in both hands may be looped over the foot. Alternatively, the vertical leg may be supported by a column or door frame.

Pavanamuktasana, also called Vatayanasana or "Wind-Relieving pose" has the hands clasped around one shin, the knee brought close to the chest. The head may be lifted, and the body may be rocked backwards and forwards with the other leg slightly lifted.

Yashtikasana, Stick pose, is like Shavasana, but with the arms stretched out on the ground above the head.

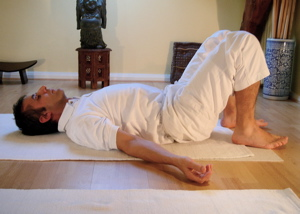
Shavasana with knees bent for people with low back pain

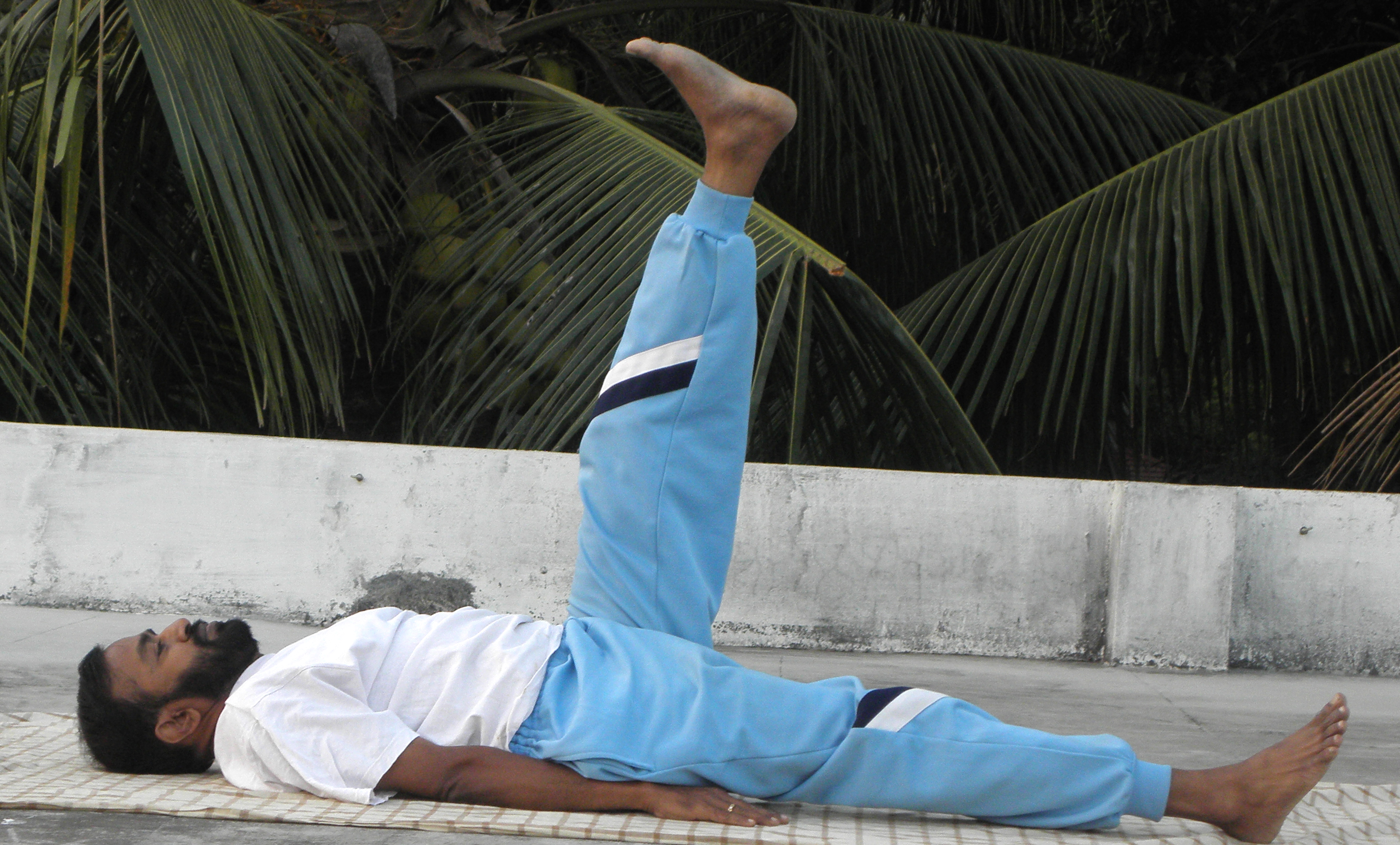
Supta Padangusthasana

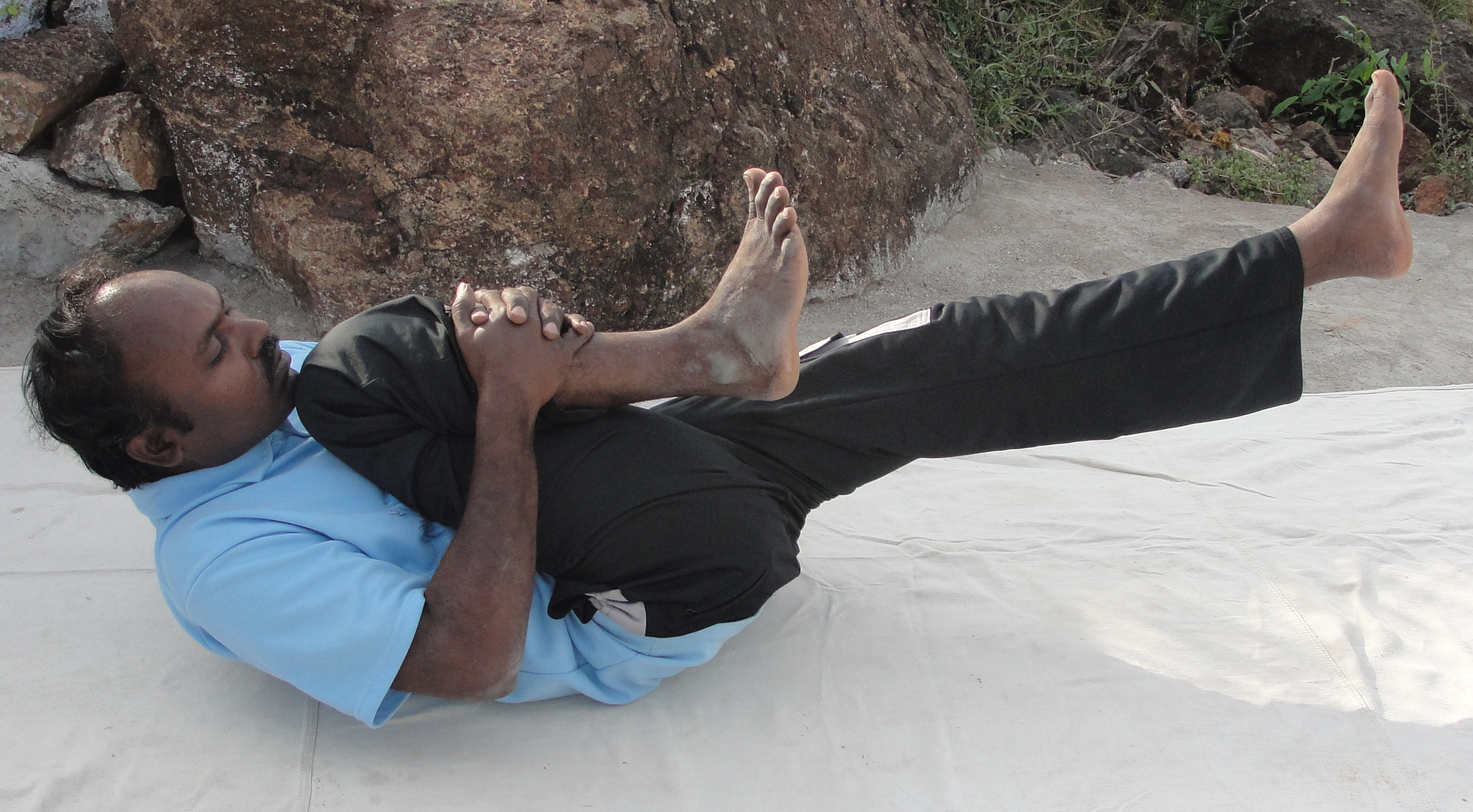
Pavanamuktasana

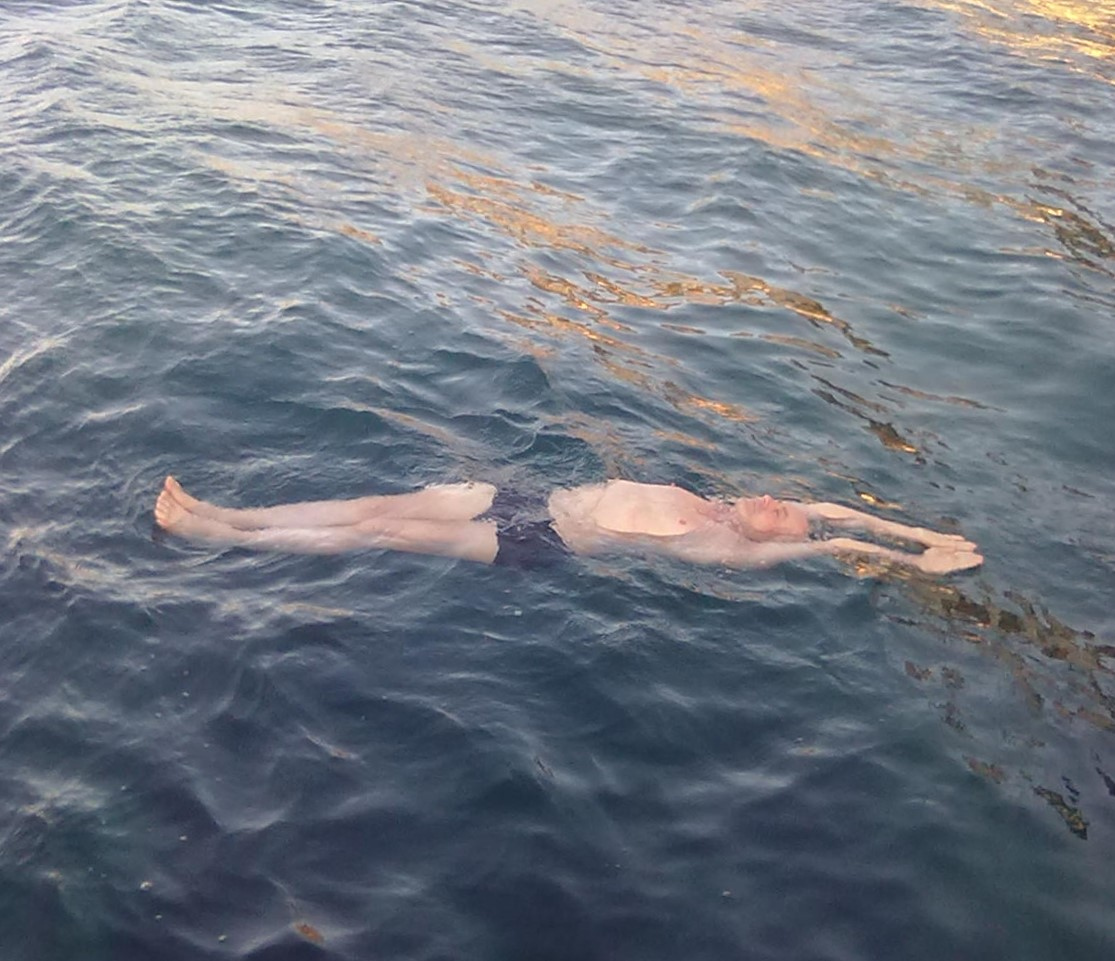
Yashtikasana (Victor Skumin floating in the pose)

== Effects ==
Shavasana is intended to rejuvenate the body, mind, and spirit. In the pose, the breath deepens, and stress is released. The yogi forgets all other thoughts and surrenders any psychological effort. While in Shavasana, yogis slip into blissful neutrality and reflect on the practice. Comfort is essential in the pose; the slightest point of discomfort can be endlessly distracting. Shavasana is a good way to reduce stress and tension.

== Relaxation and restoration ==
Modern yoga practices intended for relaxation and restoration rather than as exercise make extensive use of Shavasana. Yoga nidra ("yogic sleep") meditation is often practiced in Shavasana. Restorative Yoga, too, a style involving long holding of asanas with liberal use of props to support the body, includes multiple variations of Shavasana, with or without supports; Judith Hanson Lasater proposes five variants of Shavasana as "relaxation poses".

== See also ==
- List of asanas

== Sources ==
- Iyengar, B. K. S. (1979) [1966]. Light on Yoga: Yoga Dipika. Unwin Paperbacks.
- Lidell, Lucy (1983). The Book of Yoga: The Complete Step-By-Step Guide. London: Ebury. ISBN 978-0-85223-297-2. OCLC 12457963.
- Mehta, Silva; Mehta, Mira; Mehta, Shyam (1990). Yoga the Iyengar Way. Dorling-Kindersley.
