= Richard Miller (psychologist) =

American yoga scholar

Richard C. Miller
- Born: 1948 (age 77–78)
- Occupations: Clinical psychologist Author
- Organization(s): International Association of Yoga Therapists; Integrative Restoration Institute; Institute for Spirituality and Psychology; Marin School of Yoga
- Known for: nondual yoga research

Richard C. Miller (born 1948) is an American clinical psychologist, author, yoga scholar and advocate of yoga as therapy.

Miller is the founder and executive director of the Integrative Restoration Institute (IRI), co-founder of the International Association of Yoga Therapists (IAYT), founder of iRest Center, and founding editor of the professional Journal of IAYT. He is also a founding member and past president of the Institute for Spirituality and Psychology, senior advisor to the Baumann Institute, and was the founding president of the 501(c)(3) nonprofit Marin School of Yoga. He also serves as a board member for Cybermindz.Org, an organization founded by iRest Teacher Peter Coroneos. Since 2006, the iRest Institute has awarded over $100,000 in scholarships to students committed to learning and teaching iRest within their communities.

Miller is known for his work on using Yoga nidra to rehabilitate soldiers in pain through the iRest methodology.

== Career ==
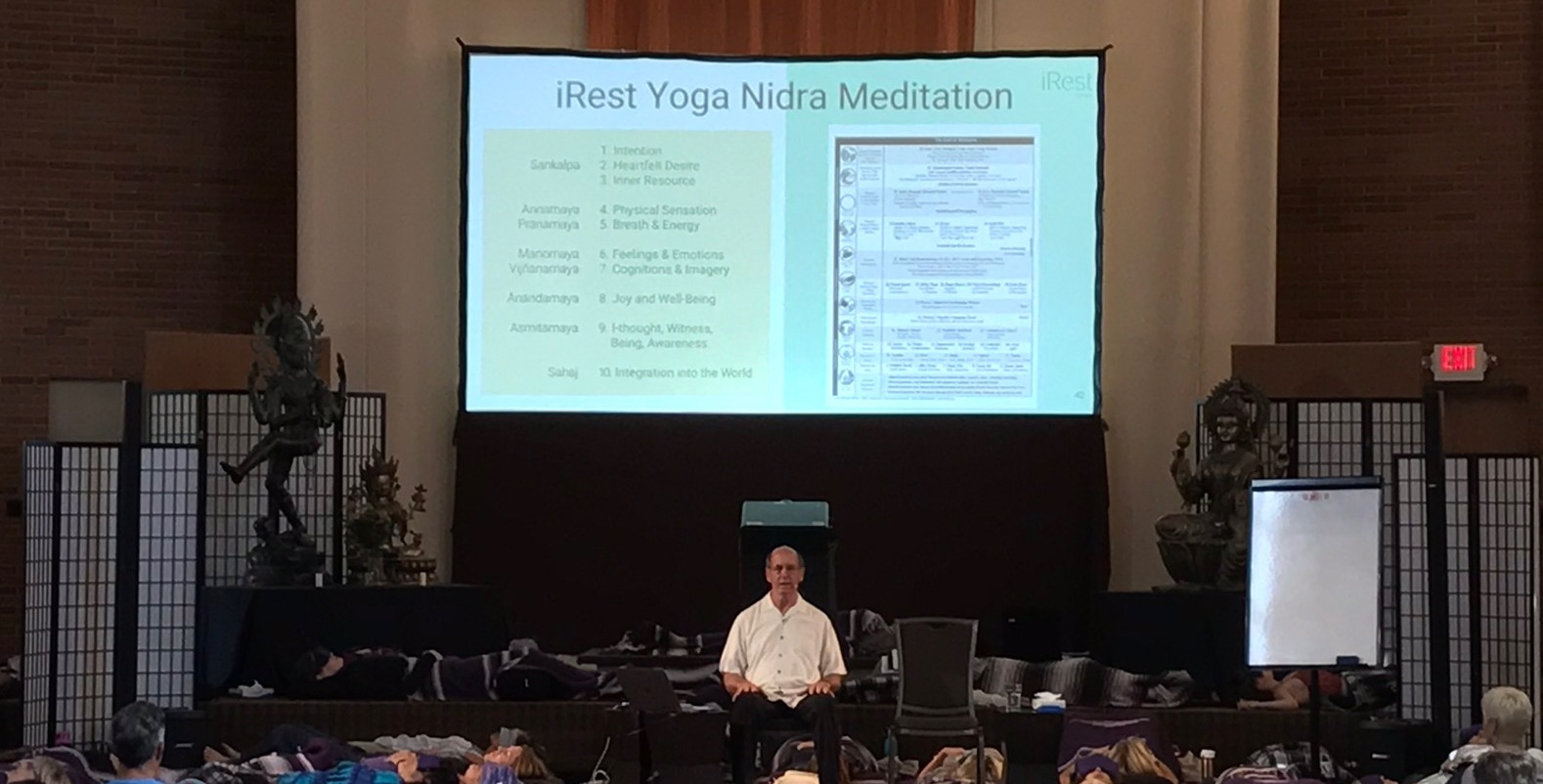
Richard Miller teaching iRest yoga nidra meditation

Miller first encountered Yoga Nidra in 1970 during a Hatha Yoga class, where the instructor introduced a basic form of Yoga Nidra.

His primary interests have included integrating nondual wisdom teachings of Yoga, Tantra, Advaita, Taoism, and Buddhism with Western psychology. In addition to his research and writing projects, Miller lectures and leads trainings and retreats internationally. Among his mentors, he credits T.K.V. Desikachar and Jean Klein.

Miller worked with Walter Reed Army Medical Center and the United States Department of Defense, to study the efficacy of iRest Yoga Nidra. The iRest protocol was used with soldiers returning from Iraq and Afghanistan suffering from post-traumatic stress disorder (PTSD). Based on this work, the Surgeon General of the United States Army endorsed Yoga Nidra as a complementary alternative medicine (CAM) for chronic pain in 2010. Continuing studies are being conducted with the use of the iRest Yoga Nidra protocol as a treatment for PTSD and related symptoms.

Miller and his organization have iRest programs in the military (active duty and veterans), homeless shelters, prisons, hospices, senior facilities, universities, chemical dependency clinics, multiple sclerosis and cancer outpatient clinics, as well as yoga and meditation studios.

== Published works ==
=== Books ===
- Miller, Richard. The iRest Program for Healing PTSD: A Proven-Effective Approach to Using Yoga Nidra Meditation and Deep Relaxation Techniques to Overcome Trauma, New Harbinger, 2015.
- Yoga Nidra: A Meditative Practice for Deep Relaxation and Healing, Sounds True, 2005 and 2010. ISBN 978-1-59179-379-3
- Gomukasana, in American Yoga, Barnes & Noble, 2003. ISBN 978-0-7607-4558-8
- The Search for Oneness, in Will Yoga and Meditation Really Change My Life? Storey Publishing, 2004. ISBN 978-1-58017-509-8
- Welcoming All That Is: Yoga Nidra and the Play of Opposites in Psychotherapy, in The Sacred Mirror: NondualWisdom & Psychotherapy, Paragon, 2003. Prendergast, Fenner & Krystal (ed.). ISBN 978-1-55778-824-5
- Opening To Empathy, UMI, Ann Arbor, Michigan, 1990
- The Theory and Practice of Yoga Nidra, Anahata Press, Mill Valley, 1985
- Langhana and Brhmana, The Institute of Yoga Teacher Education, San Francisco, 1980
- The Book of Internal Exercises, with Stephan Chang, Strawberry Hill Press, San Francisco, 1978

=== Journal articles ===
- "The Power of Mudra", Yoga Journal, Sept/Oct 1996
- "Beginner’s Yoga Column", Yoga Journal, 1995
- "The Breath of Life", Yoga Journal, May/June 1994
- "Longing For Liberation", Journal of IAYT, Vol. 4, 1993
- "The Therapeutic Application of Yoga on Sciatica: A Case Study", Journal of IAYT, Vol. 3, 1992
- "Psychophysiology of Respiration: Western and Eastern Perspectives", Journal of IAYT, Vol. II, 1991
- "Working With The Breath", Yoga Journal, September 1989
- "Suffering According to the Yoga Sutras of Patanjali", Yoga Journal, July 1986
- "Breath and Movement", Yoga Journal, July 1984
- "Yoga and The Blind", Yoga Journal, January 1978

=== Audio presentations ===
- iRest Meditation: Restorative Practices for Health, Resiliency, and Well-Being, Sounds True, 2015.
- Sounds of Silence: Chants to the Divine, 2010
- Resting In Stillness: The Practice of Integrative Restoration – iRest, 2009
- The Final Teachings: Awakening to Your True Nature: Healing and Awakening through the meditative practices of Integrative Restoration iRest Yoga Nidra, 2009
- Your Path, Buddha’s Path; Healing and Awakening through the meditative practices of Integrative Restoration iRest Yoga Nidra, 2009
- The Principles and Practice of Ujjayi Pranayama, Audiocassette Tape Set, Anahata Press, 1999
- The Principles and Practice of Yoga Nidra, Audiocassette Tape Set, Anahata Press, 1999
- Non-Dual Meditation, Audiocassette Tape, Anahata Press, 1998
- Pranayama, Breath of Life, Audiocassette Tape Set, Anahata Press, 1998
- The Yoga Sutra of Patanjali, Audiocassette Tape Set, Anahata Press, 1998
