= Yoga Journal =

American magazine on yoga as exercise

- Cover of the March 2008 issue The model is in Vasishtasana, Side Plank Pose
- Editor: Lindsay Tucker
- Managing Director of Digital: Tasha Eichenseher
- Former editors: Tasha Eichenseher, Carin Gorrell, Kaitlin Quistgaard
- Frequency: 6xs a year + 5 SIPs
- Publisher: Sharon Houghton
- Total circulation: 375,618 (December 2014)
- Founded: 1975
- First issue: May 1975
- Company: Outside
- Based in: Boulder, Colorado
- Language: English
- Website: www.yogajournal.com
- ISSN: 0191-0965

Yoga Journal is a website and digital journal, formerly a print magazine, on yoga as exercise founded in California in 1975 with the goal of combining the essence of traditional yoga with scientific understanding. It has produced live events and materials such as DVDs on yoga and related subjects.

The magazine grew from the California Yoga Teachers Association's newsletter, which was called The Word. Yoga Journal has repeatedly won Western Publications Association's Maggie Awards for "Best Health and Fitness Magazine". It has however been criticized for representing yoga as being intended for affluent white women; in 2019 it attempted to remedy this by choosing a wider variety of yoga models. The magazine was acquired by Outside in 2020.

== Beginnings ==
Yoga Journal was started in May 1975 by the California Yoga Teachers Association (CYTA), with Rama Jyoti Vernon as President, William Staniger as the founding editor, and Judith Lasater on the board and serving as copy editor. Their goal was to combine "the essence of classical yoga with the latest understandings of modern science." The journal grew from the CYTA's newsletter, which had been called The Word. Initially, the journal was staffed by volunteers, and contributors were unpaid. The first issue's 300 copies were personally distributed by the founders.

== Growth ==
By the mid-1990s, as yoga's popularity in America grew, circulation for Yoga Journal reached 66,000. In 1998 the former banker John Abbott bought the magazine and hired Kathryn Arnold as editor-in-chief. The magazine was relaunched with a new design in 2000. Since their arrival, the paid circulation grew from 90,000 to 350,000 by 2010; the readership reached over 1,300,000.

Yoga Journal has won major media awards including eight Western Publications Association's Maggie Awards for "Best Health and Fitness Magazine," and the Award's top honor for "Best Overall Consumer Publication." Forbes has called the Yoga Journal website "the Web's most expansive and impressive Yoga site."

== Coverage ==
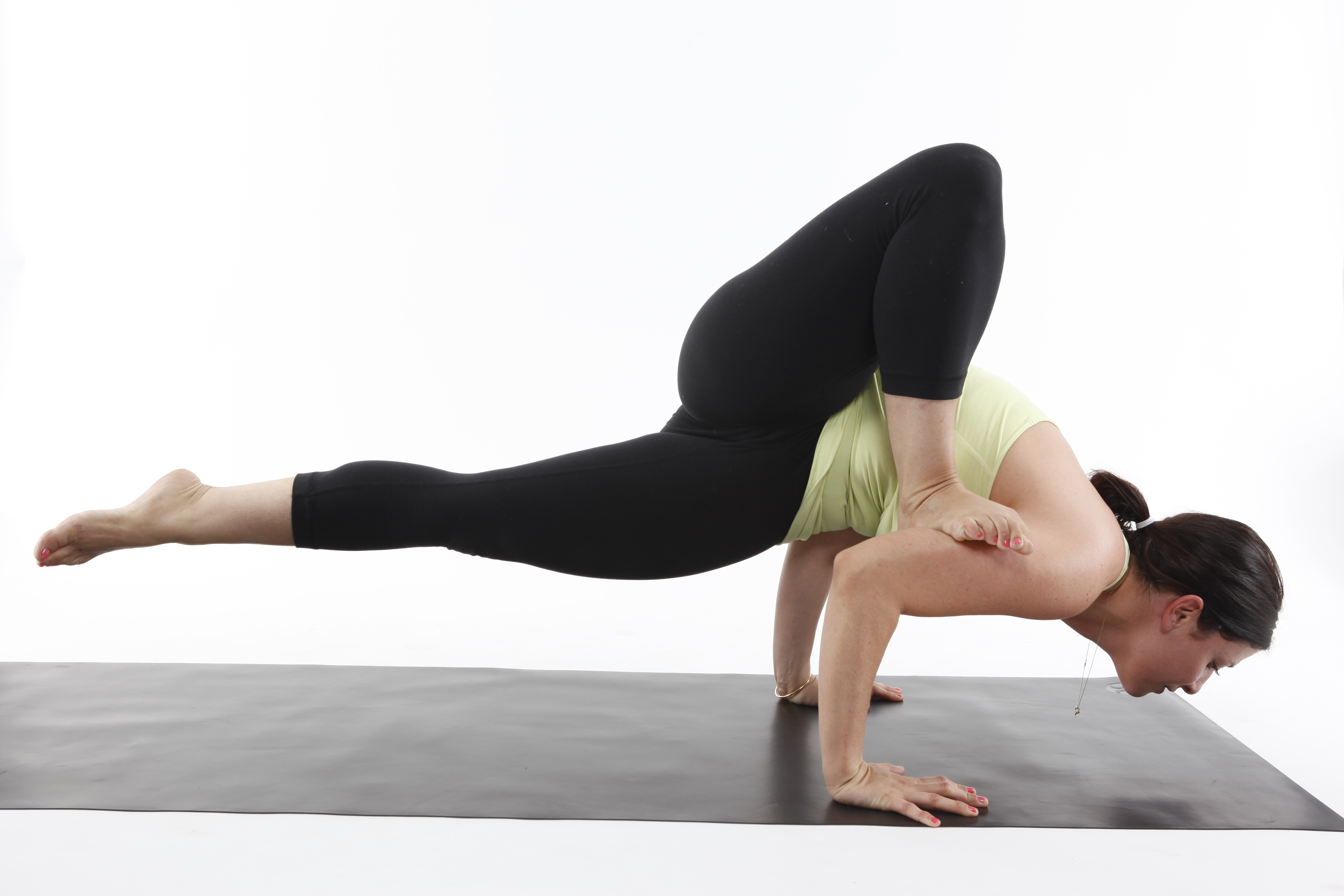
A display of Koundinyasana at the Yoga Journal Conference, 2011

Yoga Journal runs features on the themes of yoga, food and nutrition, fitness, wellness, and fashion and beauty. Its website offers definitions and advice on yoga styles and equipment, with directions for how to practise over a hundred asanas or yoga poses. Readers can select asanas by their name, their type, such as forward bends or hip-opening poses; by anatomical area, such as knees or lower back; or by claimed benefit, such as for anxiety or digestion.

The journalist Stefanie Syman calls the magazine's language that "of science and physiology, of diet and blood pressure". In her view, the journal uses "highly clinical-sounding language" even when covering "more mystical topics"; it stresses the use of yoga as therapy. Syman notes that the journal's coverage was "eclectic", especially noticeable in its calendar and classified advertisements. The magazine covers topics beyond exercise; early in the journal's history, in 1976, it published the guru Ram Dass's confession. Yoga Journal's 2012 survey, Yoga in America found the yoga market to be worth more than $10 billion per year. The data, collected by the Harris Interactive Service Bureau (HISB), showed that 20.4 million people practiced yoga in America at that time. There are 12 international editions, published in Australia, China, France, Germany, Italy, Japan, Korea, Russia, Singapore, Spain, Thailand and Turkey.

The magazine is accompanied by a program of live events, led by well-known yoga teachers and gurus such as Cyndi Lee, Judith Hanson Lasater, Kino MacGregor and Gurmukh Kaur Khalsa. The events have included an annual yoga conference, held in venues around the United States, which combined practical sessions and talks.

== Analysis ==
=== Images of women ===
The social historian Sarah Schrank records that co-founder Judith Lasater "made waves" with her public criticism of the magazine in 2010; in Lasater's view, "photos of naked or half-naked women ... do not teach the viewer about yoga practice or themselves. They aren't even about the celebration of the beauty of the human body or the beauty of the poses [asanas], which I support. These ads are just about selling a product."

The journalist Rosalie Murphy, writing in The Atlantic in 2014, stated that Yoga Journal and similar yoga magazines are illustrated in "nearly every spread" with a thin woman, nearly always white; the image of yoga that is conveyed is, she argues, that yoga is intended for affluent white women. Murphy notes that the apparent stereotype is grounded in reality: in a 2012 study by Yoga Journal itself, over 80% of American practitioners of yoga were white. The scholars Agi Wittich and Patrick McCartney wrote in 2020 that the image of contemporary yoga is the idealized, fit, young, slim, white, female yoga body, commercialized on the covers of glossy magazines such as Yoga Journal, and that non-lineage yoga evolved in reaction against that image.

In January 2019, Yoga Journal exceptionally published two covers for the magazine, one showing a slim white woman, the other showing a larger black woman, both accompanied by a headline "The Leadership Issue", intended to examine the evolution of yoga and the part played by "lineage, social media, and power dynamics." The pair of covers drew a strong response, leading the journal's brand director, Tasha Eichenseher, to respond with an apology that "we caused harm" to "communities that have been disproportionately excluded from yoga", and an explanation that she was "working to make Yoga Journal more representative—regarding age, race, ability, body type, yoga style, gender, and experience."

=== Advertising ===
In 2024, Nandini Bhalla and colleagues analysed Yoga Journal's "lifestyle advertorials" published between 2008 and 2017. The products most frequently featured were health supplements or remedies, and items such as clothing and shoes. The format most often used was the magazine's regular "Off the Mat" feature, stated to be promoting products from "our partners". Images in the advertorials were most commonly of products and of women practising yoga. Other than "Off the Mat", formats used included "text heavy" pages (with coloured headings, paragraphs of text, and a few small images) and "Gift Guides". The researchers commented that advertisements meant to resemble "editorial content" would mainly cover yoga education and practice, the advertorials instead mainly presented "clothing and herbal supplements". They echoed Erin Vinoski and colleagues' 2017 analysis of a definite "shift from yoga's philosophical roots of non-possessiveness and moderation" to commercialisation in Yoga Journal's advertisements over four decades.

== Sources ==
- Schneider, Carrie (2003). American Yoga: The paths and practices of America's greatest yoga masters. Barnes & Noble. ISBN 978-0760745588.
- Syman, Stefanie (2010). The Subtle Body: the Story of Yoga in America. Farrar, Straus and Giroux. ISBN 978-0-374-53284-0. OCLC 456171421.
