= Yoga as therapy =

Yoga in the use of physical and mental therapy

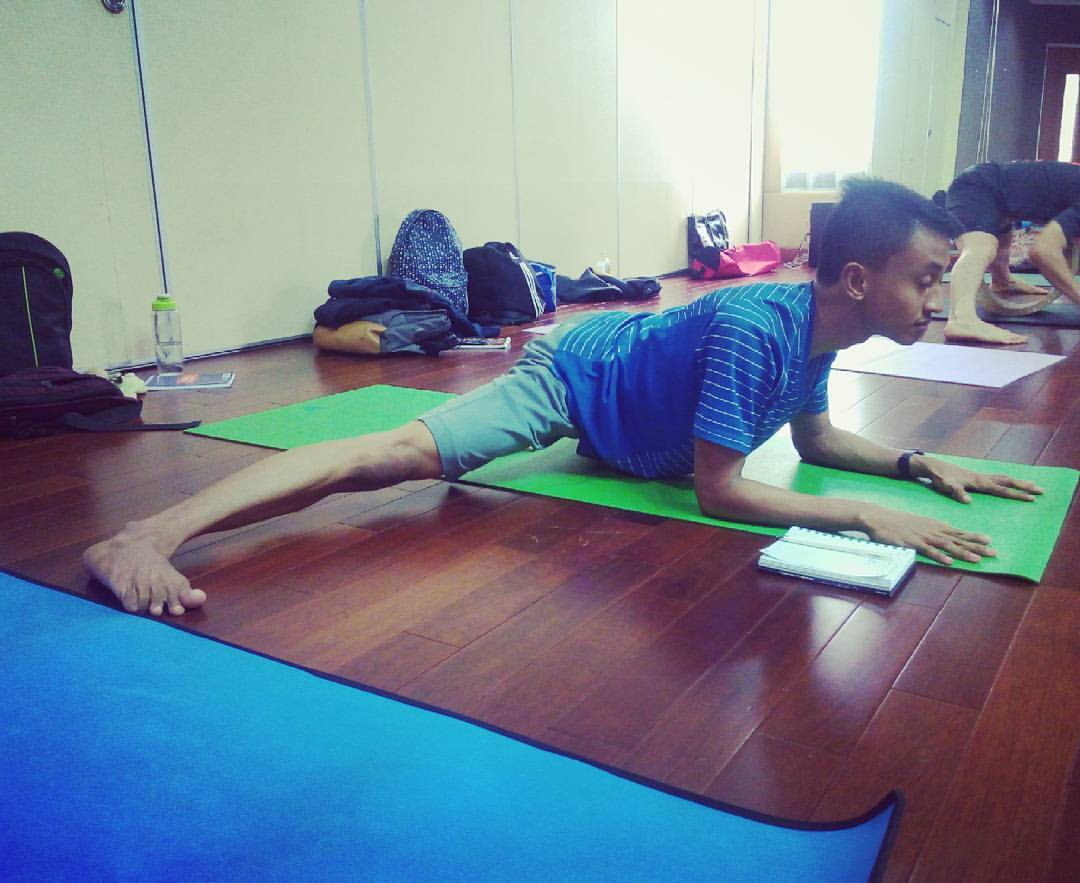
Therapeutic yoga workshop, Jakarta, 2016

Yoga as therapy is the use of yoga as exercise, consisting mainly of postures called asanas, as a gentle form of exercise and relaxation applied specifically with the intention of improving health. This form of yoga is widely practised in classes, and may involve meditation, imagery, breath work (pranayama) and calming music as well as postural yoga.

At least three types of health claims have been made for yoga: magical claims for medieval haṭha yoga, including the power of healing; unsupported claims of benefits to organ systems from the practice of asanas; and more or less well supported claims of specific medical and psychological benefits from studies of differing sizes using a wide variety of methodologies.

Systematic reviews have found some evidence of beneficial effects of yoga on low back pain and depression, but despite much investigation, little or no evidence of benefit for specific medical conditions. The study of trauma-sensitive yoga has been hampered by weak methodology.

== Context ==
Different schools teach yoga with emphasis on aerobic exercise (such as Bikram Yoga), precision in the asanas (like Iyengar Yoga), or spirituality (like Sivananda Yoga). Unbranded "hatha yoga" (not to be confused with medieval haṭha yoga) may teach any combination of these.

Yoga classes used as therapy usually consist of asanas (postures used for stretching), pranayama (breathing exercises), and relaxation in savasana (lying down). The physical asanas of modern yoga are related to medieval haṭha yoga tradition, but they were not widely practiced in India before the early 20th century.

The number of schools and styles of yoga in the Western world has grown rapidly from the late 20th century. By 2012, there were at least 19 widespread styles from Ashtanga Vinyasa Yoga to Viniyoga. These emphasise different aspects including aerobic exercise, precision in the asanas, and spirituality in the haṭha yoga tradition. These aspects can be illustrated by schools with distinctive styles. Bikram Yoga has an aerobic exercise style with rooms heated to 105 °F (41 °C) and a fixed sequence of 2 breathing exercises and 26 asanas performed in every session. Iyengar Yoga emphasises correct alignment in the postures, working slowly, if necessary with props, and ending with relaxation. Sivananda Yoga focuses more on spiritual practice, with 12 basic poses, chanting in Sanskrit, pranayama breathing exercises, meditation, and relaxation in each class, and importance is placed on a vegetarian diet.

== Types of claims ==
At least three different types of claims of therapeutic benefit have been made for yoga from medieval times onwards, not counting the more general claims of good health made throughout this period: magical powers, biomedical claims for marketing purposes, and specific medical claims. Neither of the first two are supported by reliable evidence. The medical claims are supported by evidence of varying quality, from case studies to controlled trials and ultimately systematic review of multiple trials.

=== Magical powers ===
Medieval authors asserted that Haṭha yoga brought physical (as well as spiritual) benefits, and provided magical powers, including of healing. The Hatha Yoga Pradipika (HYP) states that asanas in general, described as the first auxiliary of haṭha yoga, give "steadiness, good health, and lightness of limb." (HYP 1.17) Specific asanas, it claims, bring additional benefits; for example, Matsyendrasana awakens Kundalini and helps to prevent semen from being shed involuntarily; (HYP 1.27) Paschimottanasana "stokes up the digestive fire, slims the belly and gives good health"; (HYP 1.29) Shavasana "takes away fatigue and relaxes the mind"; (HYP 1.32) while Padmasana "destroys all diseases" (HYP 1.47). These claims lie within a tradition across all forms of yoga that practitioners can gain supernatural powers. Hemachandra's Yogashastra (1.8–9) lists the magical powers, which include healing and the destruction of poisons.

=== Biomedical claims for marketing purposes ===
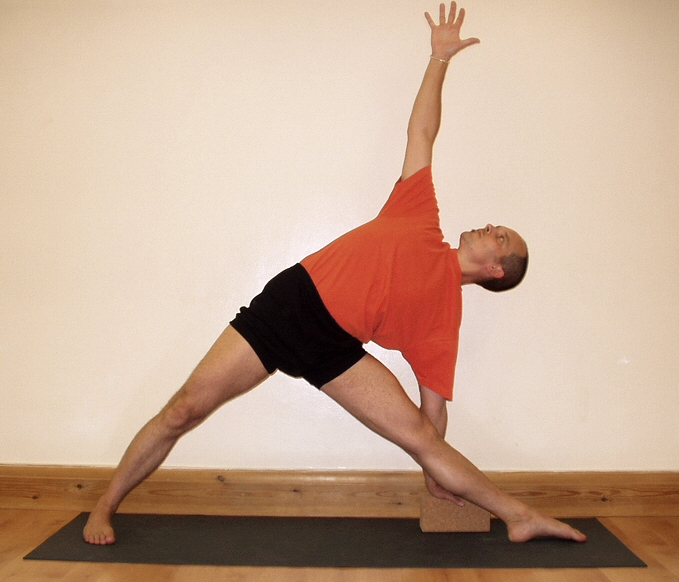
Styles of yoga differ in their approach to the asanas. Iyengar Yoga emphasises correctness, seen here as a practitioner uses a yoga brick to attain correct alignment in Utthitha Trikonasana.

Twentieth century advocates of some schools of yoga, such as B. K. S. Iyengar, have for various reasons made claims for the effects of yoga on specific organs, without citing any evidence. The yoga scholar Suzanne Newcombe argues that this was one of several visions of yoga as in some sense therapeutic, ranging from medical to a more popular offer of health and well-being. The yoga scholar Andrea Jain describes these claims of Iyengar's in terms of "elaborating and fortifying his yoga brand" and "mass-marketing", calling Iyengar's 1966 book Light on Yoga "arguably the most significant event in the process of elaborating the brand." The yoga teacher Bernie Gourley notes that the book neither describes contraindications systematically, nor provides evidence for the claimed benefits. Jain suggests that "Its biomedical dialect was attractive to many." For example, in the book, Iyengar claims that the asanas of the Eka Pada Sirsasana cycle

...tone up the muscular, nervous and circulatory systems of the entire body. The spine receives a rich supply of blood, which increases the nervous energy in the chakras (the various nerve plexuses situated in the spine), the flywheels in the human body machine. These poses develop the chest and make the breathing fuller and the body firmer; they stop nervous trembling of the body and prevent the diseases which cause it; they also help to eliminate toxins by supplying pure blood to every part of the body and bringing the congested blood back to the heart and lungs for purification.

The history of such claims was reviewed by William J. Broad in his 2012 book The Science of Yoga. Broad argues that while the health claims for yoga began as Hindu nationalist posturing, it turns out that there is ironically "a wealth of real benefits".

=== Possible mechanisms ===
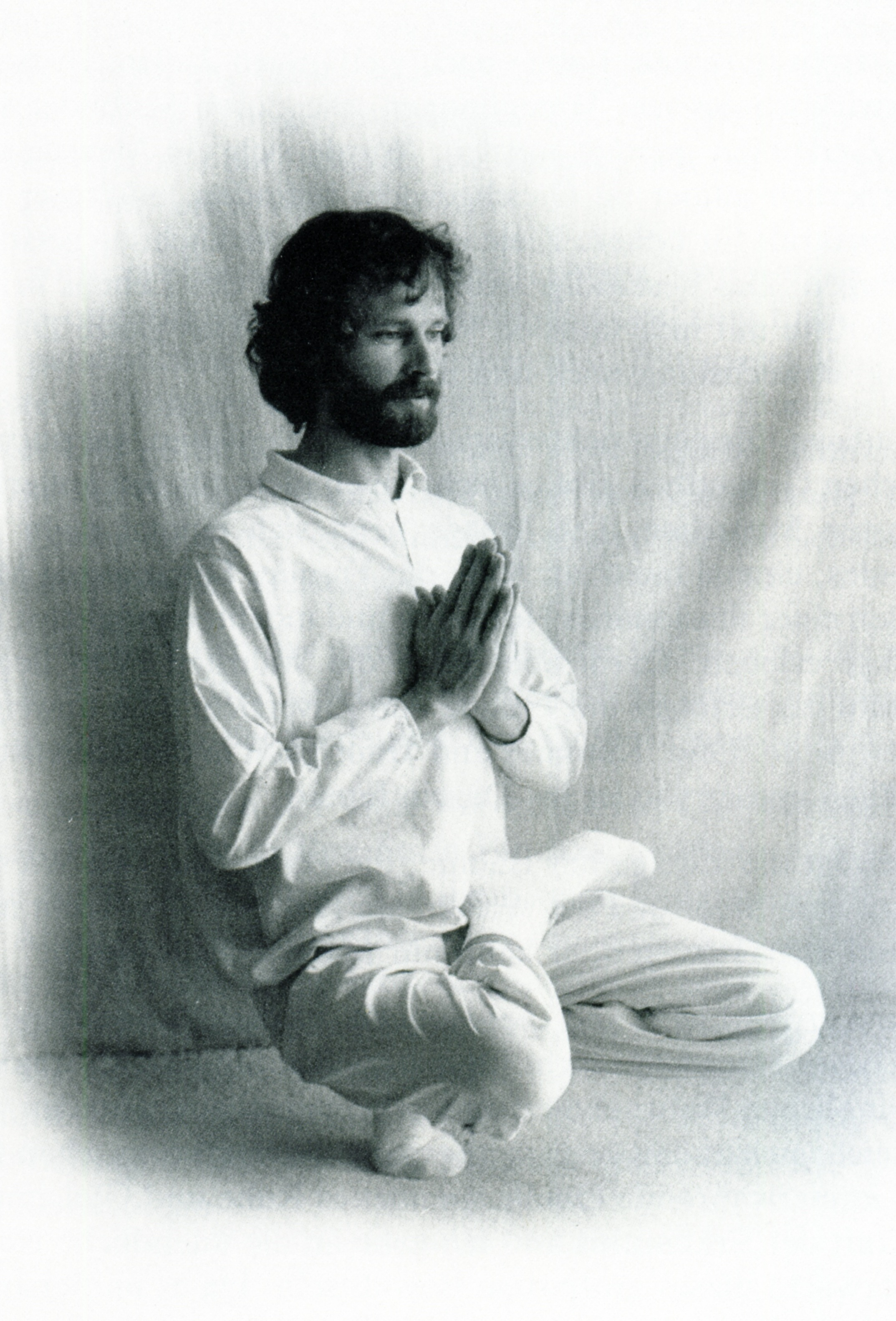
One of the possible mechanisms for therapeutic effects of yoga is the mastery of difficult asanas, here Padangushtasana demonstrated by Heinz Grill, which could prompt practitioners to reconsider limiting assumptions in their lives.

The psychiatrist Bessel van der Kolk in his 2014 book The Body Keeps the Score, and the scholar of religion Paul Bramadat (who cites van der Kolk and adds his own reasoning) in his 2025 book Yogalands, have proposed multiple mechanisms by which yoga could provide therapeutic benefits. In their opinions, these hypotheses remained under-researched at the times they were writing.

Mechanisms by which yoga could potentially provide therapeutic benefits
Yoga action	Hypothesised benefits	Author
Breathwork	Calm via parasympathetic nervous system	Bessel van der Kolk
Follow teacher's cues, maintain balance	Better proprioception	Bessel van der Kolk
Get adjusted by teacher	Grow used to having body seen and touched	Bessel van der Kolk
Attend to fluctuations of mind and body	Better interoception	Bessel van der Kolk
Join yoga communities	Less anomie, alienation	Bessel van der Kolk
Focus on body in present moment	Freedom from mental loop of traumatic memories (temporarily)	Bessel van der Kolk
Master "impossible" asanas with practice	Reconsider other limiting assumptions in one's life	Paul Bramadat

== Types of activity ==
=== Remedial yoga ===
The International Association of Yoga Therapists offers a definition of yoga therapy that can encompass a wide range of activities and practices, calling it "the process of empowering individuals to progress toward improved health and well-being through the application of the teachings and practices of Yoga".

The history of remedial yoga goes back to the pioneers of yoga as exercise, Krishnamacharya and Iyengar. Iyengar was sickly as a child, and yoga with his brother-in-law Krishnamacharya improved his health; it had also helped his daughter Geeta, so his response to his students' health issues, in Newcombe's view, "was an intense and personal one." In effect Iyengar was treating "remedial yoga" as analogous to Henrik Ling's medical gymnastics. As early as 1940, Iyengar was using yoga as a therapy for common conditions such as sinus problems, backache, and fatigue. Iyengar was willing to push people through pain "to [show] them new possibilities." In the 1960s, he trained a few people such as Diana Clifton and Silva Mehta to deliver this remedial yoga; particular asanas were used for different conditions, and non-remedial Iyengar Yoga teachers were taught to inform students that ordinary classes were not suitable for "serious health issues". Mehta taught a remedial yoga class in the Iyengar Yoga Institute in Maida Vale from its opening in 1984. She contributed "Remedial Programs" for conditions such as arthritis, backache, knee cartilage problems, pregnancy, sciatica, scoliosis and varicose veins in the Mehtas' 1990 book Yoga the Iyengar Way. However, Iyengar was deferential to Western medicine and its assessments, so in Newcombe's view Iyengar Yoga is "positioned as complementary to standard medical treatment rather than as an alternative".

Newcombe argues that in Britain, yoga "largely avoided overt conflict with the medical profession by simultaneously professionalising with educational qualifications and deferring to medical expertise." After Richard Hittleman's Yoga for Health series on ITV from 1971 to 1974, the series producer Howard Kent founded a charity, the Yoga for Health Foundation, for "Research into the therapeutic benefits to be obtained by the practice of yoga"; residential courses began in 1978 at Ickwell Bury in Bedfordshire. The Foundation stated that yoga was not a therapy or cure but had "therapeutic benefits", whether physical, mental, or emotional, and it worked especially with "the physically handicapped". Newcombe notes that a third organisation, the Yoga Biomedical Trust, was founded in Cambridge in 1983 by a biologist, Robin Monro, to research complementary therapies. He found it difficult to obtain research funding, and in the 1990s moved to London, focusing on training yoga teachers in yoga as therapy and providing yoga as individualised therapy, using pranayama, relaxation and asanas.

=== Sports medicine ===
From the point of view of sports medicine, asanas function as active stretches, helping to protect muscles from injury; these need to be performed equally on both sides, the stronger side first if used for physical rehabilitation.

== Research ==
=== Methodology ===
Much of the research on the therapeutic use of yoga has been in the form of preliminary studies or clinical trials of low methodological quality, including small sample sizes, inadequate control and blinding, lack of randomization, and high risk of bias. Further research is needed to quantify the benefits and to clarify the mechanisms involved.

For example, a 2010 literature review on the use of yoga for depression stated, "although the results from these trials are encouraging, they should be viewed as very preliminary because the trials, as a group, suffered from substantial methodological limitations." A 2015 systematic review on the effect of yoga on mood and the brain recommended that future clinical trials should apply more methodological rigour.

=== Mechanisms ===
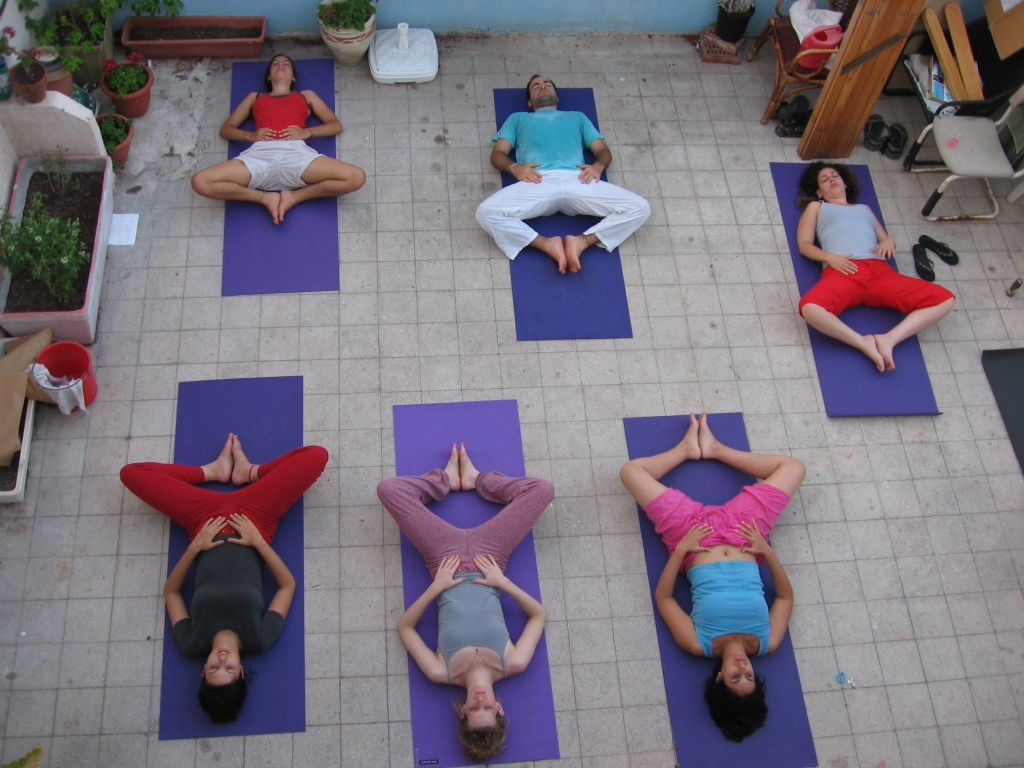
A yoga class relaxing in Supta Baddha Konasana. There is evidence that asana practice relieves stress by multiple mechanisms.

The practice of asanas has been claimed to improve flexibility, strength, and balance; to alleviate stress and anxiety, and to reduce the symptoms of lower back pain, without necessarily demonstrating the precise mechanisms involved. A review of five studies noted that three psychological mechanisms (positive affect, mindfulness, self-compassion) and four biological mechanisms (posterior hypothalamus, interleukin-6, C-reactive protein and cortisol) that might act on stress had been examined empirically, whereas many other potential mechanisms remain to be studied; four of the mechanisms (positive affect, self-compassion, inhibition of the posterior hypothalamus and salivary cortisol) were found to mediate yoga's effect on stress.

=== Low back pain ===
Back pain is one reason people take up yoga, and since at least the 1960s some practitioners have claimed that it relieved their symptoms. Yoga results in clinically unimportant improvements in pain and back-specific function; improvements in back-specific function are similar to those obtained from other forms of therapeutic exercise, such as physical therapy.

=== Mental disorders ===
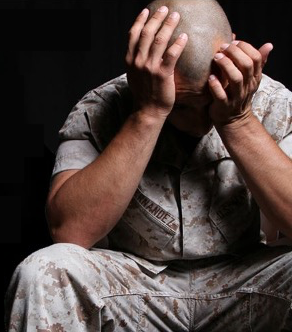
Trauma-sensitive yoga has been developed in the US in the hope of benefiting individuals suffering from psychological trauma.

Yoga can form a useful component of treatment for PTSD, though its effect is no different from other forms of physical exercise.

=== Cardiovascular health ===
A 2012 survey of yoga in Australia notes that there is "good evidence" that yoga and its associated healthy lifestyle—often vegetarian, usually non-smoking, preferring organic food, drinking less or no alcohol–are beneficial for cardiovascular health, but that there was "little apparent uptake of yoga to address [existing] cardiovascular conditions and risk factors". Yoga was cited by respondents as a cause of these lifestyle changes. The survey notes that the relative importance of the various factors had not been assessed.

=== Long COVID ===
For people who had long-lasting effects after COVID-19, in 2021 Iyengar Yoga (UK) teachers studied how yoga could be applied to assist recovery. They prepared a video and booklet presenting suggestions for a programme of yoga for this purpose. The booklet proposes multiple supported asanas using simple props such as chairs, cushions, and blankets to allow sufferers to rest in the asanas. For example, Adho Mukha Virasana ("Face down hero pose") has the sufferer kneeling on a mat, with the body folded forwards, the body and head supported on a bolster and blanket. The supported asanas are stated to be the product of "decades" of work by B.K.S. Iyengar and Geeta Iyengar's medical yoga classes in Pune, India.

The yoga scholar Suzanne Newcombe describes the 3-month study on which the guidance was based as "nuanced experiential interventions". In the study, the sufferers were self-diagnosed "but were economically stable enough to have a quiet private room, [and] fast internet access". The 115 Iyengar teachers involved gave free classes on Zoom, attending each of 55 individuals remotely with two yoga teachers and one "specialist therapy teacher". They adapted the asanas for each sufferer according to their symptoms and their responses to the asanas. Most sufferers had tried yoga before but did not practise regularly. Data were self-reported by sufferers before and after each session. The results were statistically significant, showing benefits in "physical and mental wellbeing", fatigue, and anxiety; headaches and ease of breathing did not improve. In Newcombe's view, the participants were taught "how to rest and recover"; the programme gave them "something specific and proactive to do which was manageable." She notes that nearly all the participants reported that they had found it important that "the yoga teachers took their symptoms seriously and were giving focused attention towards exploring what specific positions and actions helped them feel better."

=== Other conditions ===
There is little reliable evidence that yoga is beneficial for specific medical conditions, and an increasing amount of evidence that it is not. For instance it offers no benefit in ADHD.

Evidence for applicability to specific medical conditions
Condition	Study	Date	Findings
Rheumatic diseases	Systematic review	2013	Weak support in terms of pain and disability, no evidence on safety
Epilepsy or menopause-related symptoms	Systematic review	2015	No evidence of benefit
Cancer	American Cancer Society's opinion	2019	Can improve strength and balance; is "unlikely to cause harm", does not "interfere with cancer treatment"; "cannot cure cancer"; may improve quality of life in cancer survivors, as in a randomised controlled trial of women who had had breast cancer. Measured outcomes included fatigue, depression, and sleep quality.
Dementia	Systematic review	2015	"Promising" evidence that exercise helps with activities of daily living; no evidence of benefit to cognition, neuropsychiatric symptoms, or depression; yoga was not distinguished from other forms of exercise.
Attention deficit hyperactivity disorder	Systematic review	2010	No effect, measured by teacher rating on the ADHD overall scale.
Female urinary incompetence	Systematic review	2019	Insufficient evidence
Irritable bowel syndrome	Systematic reviews	2024, 2025	Weak studies

== Safety ==
Although relatively safe, yoga is not a risk-free form of exercise. Sensible precautions can usefully be taken, such as avoiding advanced moves by beginners, not combining practice with psychoactive drug use, and avoiding competitiveness.

A small percentage of yoga practitioners each year suffer physical injuries analogous to sports injuries. The practice of yoga has been cited as a cause of hyperextension or rotation of the neck, which may be a precipitating factor in cervical artery dissection.

== See also ==
- Exercise is Medicine
- Neurobiological effects of physical exercise
- Restorative Yoga
- Yoga foot drop

== Sources ==
- Bramadat, Paul (2025). Yogalands: in search of practice on the mat and in the world. Montreal: McGill-Queen's University Press. ISBN 978-0-2280-2374-6.
- Broad, William J. (2012). The Science of Yoga: The Risks and the Rewards. Simon & Schuster. ISBN 978-1-4516-4142-4.
- Goldberg, Elliott (2016). The Path of Modern Yoga: the history of an embodied spiritual practice. Inner Traditions. ISBN 978-1-62055-567-5. OCLC 926062252.
- Iyengar, B. K. S. (1979) [1966]. Light on Yoga: Yoga Dipika. Unwin Paperbacks. ISBN 978-1-85538-166-7.
- Jain, Andrea (2015). Selling Yoga: from Counterculture to Pop culture. Oxford University Press. ISBN 978-0-19-939024-3. OCLC 878953765.
- Mallinson, James; Singleton, Mark (2017). Roots of Yoga. Penguin Books. ISBN 978-0-241-25304-5. OCLC 928480104.
- Mehta, Silva; Mehta, Mira; Mehta, Shyam (1990). Yoga the Iyengar Way: The new definitive guide to the most practised form of yoga. Dorling Kindersley. ISBN 978-0-86318-420-8.
- Newcombe, Suzanne (2019). Yoga in Britain: Stretching Spirituality and Educating Yogis. Bristol, England: Equinox Publishing. ISBN 978-1-78179-661-0.
- Singleton, Mark (2010). Yoga Body: the origins of modern posture practice. Oxford University Press. ISBN 978-0-19-539534-1. OCLC 318191988.
