= Himalayan Siddhaa Akshar =

Indian yoga instructor

Himalayan Siddhaa Akshar, also known as Grand Master Akshar, is an Indian yoga guru, spiritual leader and author. He is the founder and chairman of Akshar Yoga Kendraa (formerly Akshar Yoga Research and Development Centre), an institution headquartered in Bengaluru, India, which offers yoga training and research. The institution is accredited by the Ministry of Ayush, Government of India, under the Yoga Certification Board in the yoga institution category. He is known for organizing large-scale yoga events that have set multiple Guinness World Records.

== Early life and background ==
Akshar was born on August 28, 1983, in the Bilaspur district of Himachal Pradesh, India. He was raised in a military family, which led to frequent travel across various parts of India during his childhood. He cites the Himalayan region and its spiritual traditions as a primary influence on his interest in yoga and spirituality.

== Career ==
Akshar established Akshar Yoga, an organization focused on teaching yoga asanas, pranayama, and meditation. He later founded the Akshar Yoga Research and Development Centre (now Akshar Yoga Kendraa), located at the Padukone - Dravid Centre for Sports Excellence in Bengaluru. He has trained several notable figures in sports and entertainment, including Indian cricketer Sunil Gavaskar, Australian cricketer Matthew Hayden, and the wrestling duo the Phogat sisters (Geeta and Babita Phogat). He has expanded his organization internationally, with affiliates and teaching programs in countries including France, the United States, the United Kingdom, Taiwan, and Dubai.

Akshar also serves as the President of the World Yoga Organisation and the International Siddha Foundation, organizations he established to promote yoga and Siddha globally.

Through Akshar Yoga Kendraa, Akshar has been associated with public wellness initiatives related to breathwork and health awareness. In 2025, the organization reported launching the "India Breathe Again" campaign, described as a nationwide initiative promoting conscious breathing practices in the context of air pollution and respiratory health concerns.

According to organizational materials and media reports, the campaign included structured breathwork programmes, public participation initiatives, synchronized breathing sessions, and digital outreach efforts. The organization has also been involved in community activities, including food distribution drives at Jagannath Temple, where meals were provided to pilgrims and local communities.

Akshar and his organization have set multiple Guinness World Records for mass participation in yoga. A record was set in August 2022 for the most people performing the Dhanurasana simultaneously. In February 2023, the organization set three separate records for the most people holding Vashishtasana (Side Plank), Ushtrasana (Camel Pose), and Halasana during the Mandala Yoga Festival in Bengaluru. In June 2024, during International Yoga Day celebrations, the organization set five new records, including those for Naukasana, Koundinyasana, Chakrasana, Natarajasana, and Surya Namaskar.

In March 2025, Himalayan Siddhaa Akshar was mentioned in Taiwanese media coverage relating to a public yoga session and promotional appearance involving Olympic badminton gold medalist Lee Yang. Reports described Akshar leading or participating in yoga activities connected to the event, which drew attention due to Lee’s post-Olympic public engagements and interest in wellness practices. Taiwanese news outlets covered the interaction as part of broader reporting on Lee’s media appearances and activities following his Olympic success, noting the inclusion of yoga instruction and wellness-focused programming.

The event reportedly involved participation from over 3,000 practitioners and included live training sessions led by Akshar.

Akshar has delivered talks on yoga, mindfulness, and leadership across various platforms. He has also been listed as a speaker at TEDx events, where he presented a talk titled "Your Thoughts Are Your Leader," addressing themes related to thought patterns, awareness, and decision-making.

== Institutional developments ==
In March 2026, Akshar Yoga Kendraa announced the establishment of PURANTHA, a yoga and spiritual sciences centre near Kempegowda International Airport, Bengaluru. The campus is reported to span approximately 165,000 square feet and is intended to offer training in yogic practices such as asana, pranayama, and meditation.

According to statements from the organisation, the centre is designed as a facility for the study and practice of Himalayan yogic traditions and Siddha systems, incorporating training, research, and residential learning components. The organisation has stated that the campus is planned to train up to 100,000 yoga teachers annually through structured programmes; however, independent verification of this capacity has not been widely reported.

== Selected works ==
- The Science of Mudras (2022) ISBN 978-9393229663
- Yoga Namaskar (2019) ISBN 978-0241356999
