= Scorpion pose =

Inverted back-bending asana in modern yoga

Scorpion pose variant with one leg bent

Scorpion pose or Vrischikasana is an inverted asana in modern yoga as exercise that combines a forearm balance and backbend; the variant with hands rather than forearms on the floor, elbows bent, is called Ganda Bherundasana. Light on Yoga treats both forearm and hand balance forms as variants of this pose. It is a part of the headstand cycle in some yoga traditions.

A similar pose, Pincha Mayurasana or Feathered Peacock pose, is a forearm balance with the body raised and the legs straight, giving some resemblance to a peacock's tail. Its preparatory pose is variously called Ardha Pincha Mayurasana or Dolphin pose.

== Etymology and origins ==
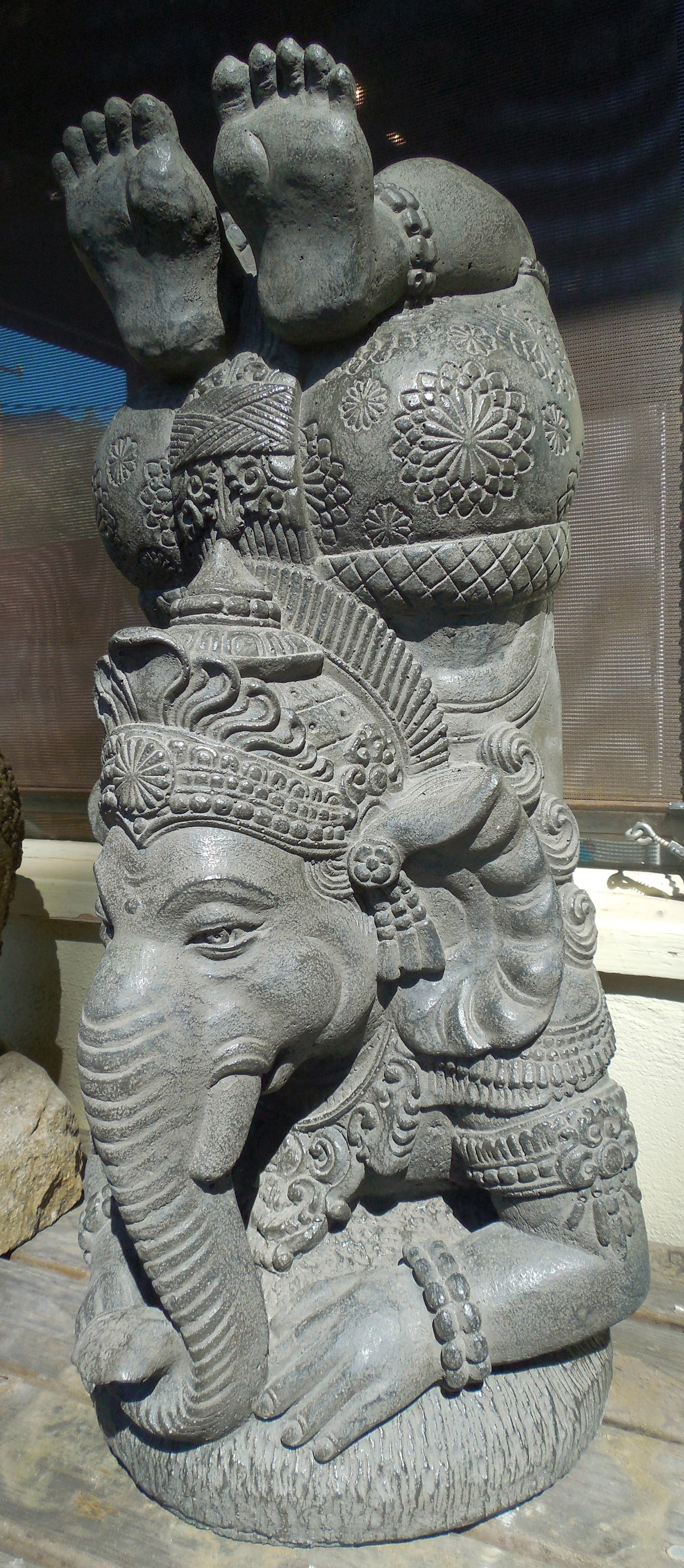
20th century statue of Ganesha in Pincha Mayurasana

The name of this pose is from Sanskrit वृश्चिक vṛścika, "scorpion", and आसन āsana, "posture" or "seat". Pincha (Sanskrit पिञ्च Piñcha) means feathered.

The pose is not found in medieval hatha yoga texts, but is described in 20th-century manuals such as Light on Yoga.

== Description ==
Because it requires strength, balance, and flexibility, Vrischikasana is described as an advanced posture: The yoga specialist B. K. S. Iyengar's 1966 Light on Yoga grades it as level 32 out of 60. In the basic pose, the body is balanced as in headstand, but the legs are bent and the back is lightly arched, and the head is lifted so that the body is supported only by the forearms. A more advanced variant has the back arched further so the feet touch the top of the head. A second advanced variant has the legs held straight out horizontally above the head and arms, resembling the scorpion's tail stretched in a threat posture forwards over its body. The pose can also be executed in a variant with straight arms. Whether resting on forearms (Pincha Mayurasana) or with arms in handstand, the asana can be worked towards with the use of a chair to support the feet.

Light on Yoga distinguishes Vrischikasana I (forearm balance, feet on head, plates 536 and 537) and Vrischikasana II (handstand, feet on head, plate 538), describing the second as an "extremely difficult" balance. The placing of the feet on the head is stated to indicate an attempt to subjugate the ego with its "deadly" scorpionlike emotions.

== Variations ==
=== Beginner to intermediate ===
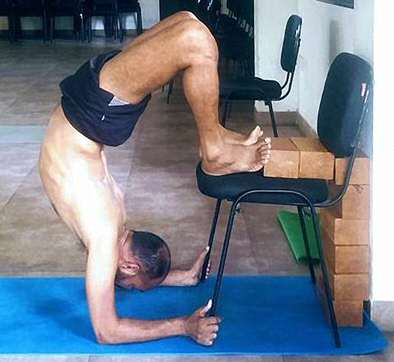
An advanced form of Vrischikasana using props

Ardha Pincha Mayurasana (Half Feathered Peacock pose), also called Dolphin pose, has the forearms on the floor as for the full pose, but the feet remain on the floor as in Downward Dog Pose. The pose may be begun with the body nearly horizontal, much as in Chaturanga Dandasana, Low Plank Pose, and the legs may then be walked forwards to raise the back to a high angle. A dolphin exercise alternates repeatedly between the low variant, with the head in front of the hands and the elbows flexed, and the high variant, with the hips raised and the head behind the hands. One leg may be raised in line with the body (One-legged Dolphin pose).

The full pose can be approached with the hands near a wall, and the legs can be jumped up to rest on the wall; a further step, with the body vertical, is to bend the knees so that the feet are flat on the wall; then balance can be explored, raising one foot to the vertical. Props may be used to assist with alignment: a block may be placed against the wall, between the hands; a strap may be fastened around the arms just above the elbows.

Practitioners are cautioned not to attempt the full balance away from the wall until they are not using props and have the strength and flexibility to land safely if they fall; this requires the ability to perform backarches such as Urdhva Dhanurasana, Upwards Bow pose.

=== Advanced ===
Pincha Mayurasana (Feathered Peacock pose), is a forearm balance similar to Vrischikasana, but the legs are straight, stretched up over the head, with the back less extremely arched. According to B. K. S Iyengar's Light on Yoga, this pose is reminiscent of a peacock beginning a dance during the monsoon, where the peacock raises the tail and opens the feathers.

Sayanasana (Posture of Repose) is the same as Pincha Mayurasana, but with only the elbows on the ground, the hands cradling the face, making it a difficult balance.

Ganda Bherundasana (Formidable Face pose) is similar to Pincha Mayurasana but with bent arms and only the hands on the ground; the back is lightly arched and the legs and feet point vertically upwards. It may be practised with a block under the shoulders.

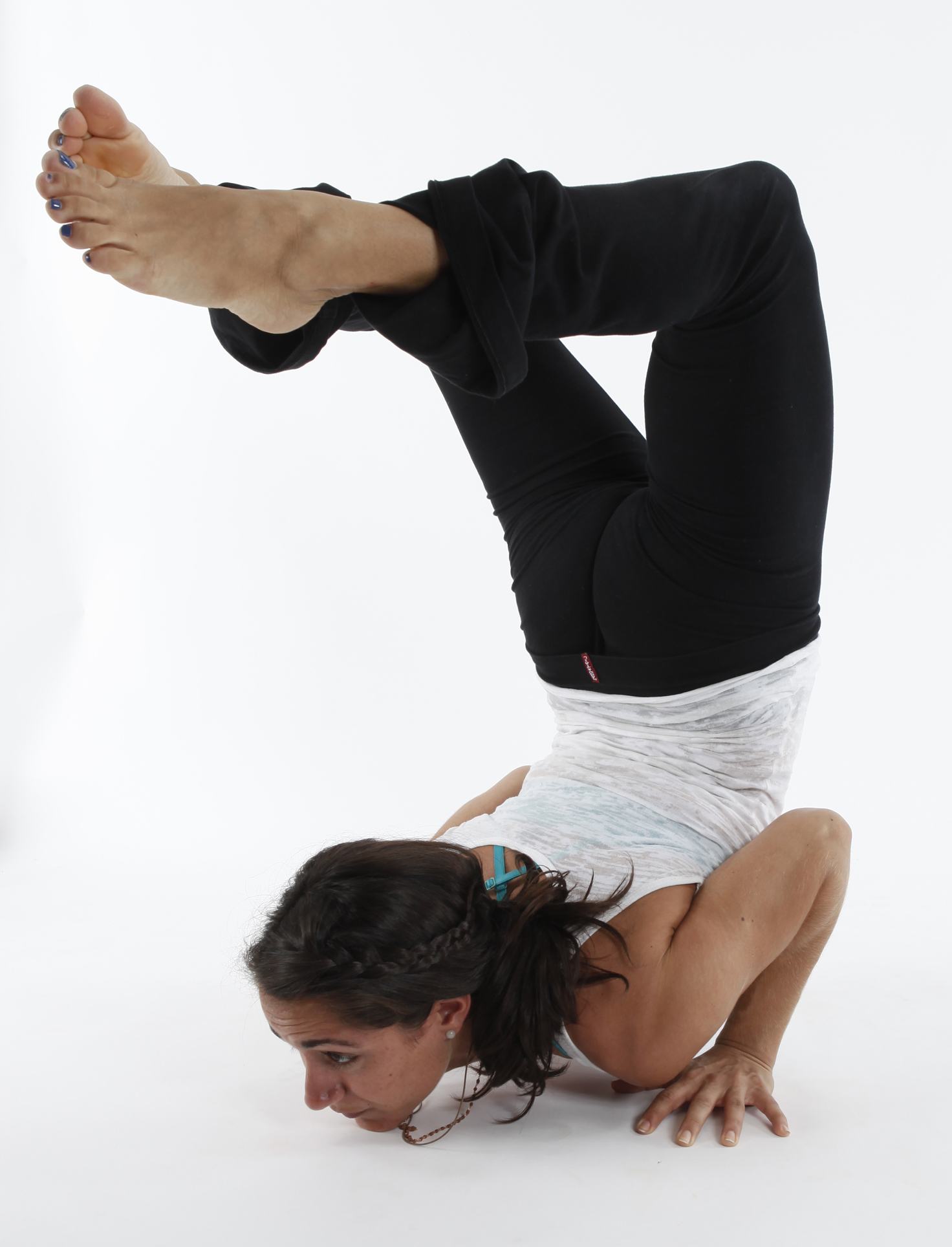
Ganda Bherundasana uses hand rather than forearm balance.

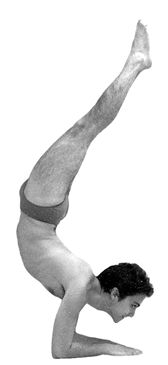
Pincha Mayurasana

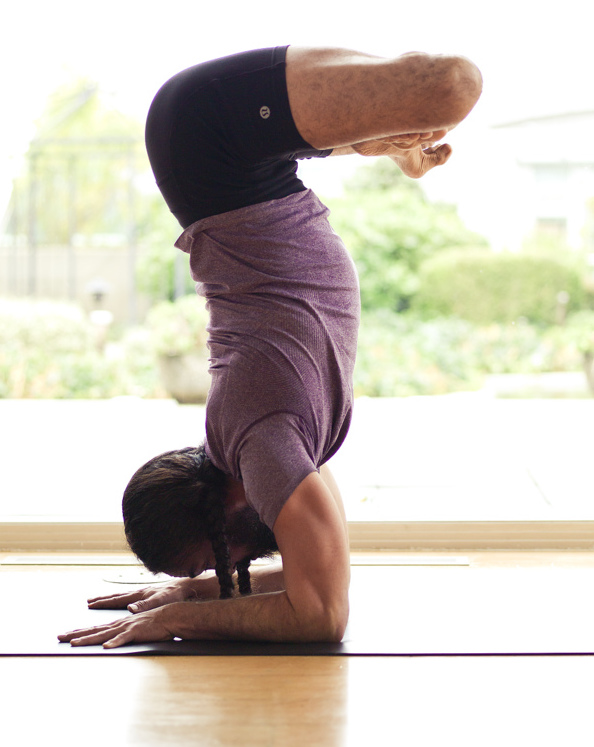
Pincha Mayurasana with legs in lotus position

== Record ==
In 2022, the Indian yoga teacher Yash Moradiya held the pose for 29 minutes and 4 seconds, as measured by Guinness World Records in Dubai, UAE.

== See also ==
- List of asanas
- Scorpion kick

== Sources ==
- Iyengar, B. K. S. (1979) [1966]. Light on Yoga: Yoga Dipika. Unwin Paperbacks. ISBN 978-1855381667.
