= Iyengar Yoga =

School of modern yoga

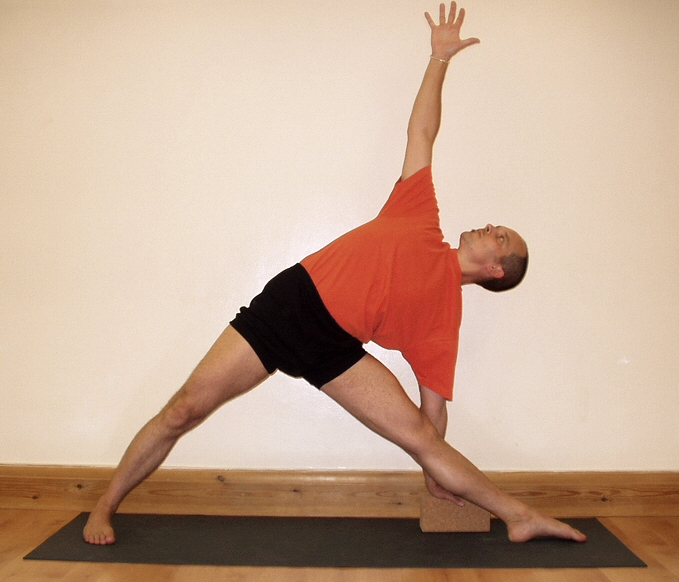
- Utthita Trikonasana, with a Yoga brick to assist correct alignment
- Founder: B. K. S. Iyengar
- Established: 1970s
- Derivative forms: Anusara Yoga, Forrest Yoga

Practice emphasises
- Attention to detail and precise focus on body alignment, often with the use of props

Related schools
- Ashtanga (vinyasa) yoga

Iyengar Yoga, named after and developed by B. K. S. Iyengar, and described in his bestselling 1966 book Light on Yoga, is a form of yoga as exercise that has an emphasis on detail, precision and alignment in the performance of yoga postures (asanas).

The style often makes use of props, such as belts, blocks, and blankets, as aids in performing the asanas. The props enable beginning students, the elderly, or those with physical limitations to perform the asanas correctly, minimising the risk of injury or strain.

== History ==
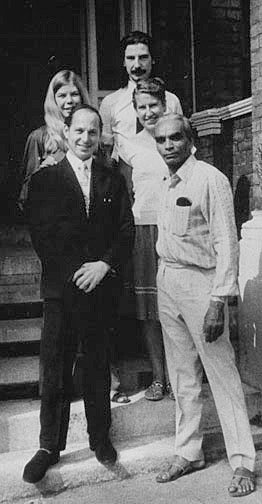
BKS Iyengar Centre House: Iyengar with yoga teacher Malcolm Strutt in London, 1971. Photo by John Hills

B. K. S. Iyengar learnt yoga from Tirumalai Krishnamacharya at the Mysore Palace, as did Pattabhi Jois; Iyengar Yoga and Jois's Ashtanga (vinyasa) yoga are thus branches of the same yoga lineage, sharing many of the same asanas and other practices. Iyengar began teaching yoga as exercise gradually, starting with individual pupils such as the violinist Yehudi Menuhin, whom he met in 1952; Menuhin's fame helped to propel Iyengar Yoga as a brand in the Western world.

A landmark was the publication of Iyengar's bestselling book Light on Yoga in 1966, describing over 200 asanas in "unprecedented" detail. The yoga scholar Andrea Jain called the book "arguably the most significant event in the process of elaborating the [Iyengar Yoga] brand". Jain and others have noted that the book's biomedical claims, such as of toning up various organs of the body, were attractive to its audience but were stated directly without any supporting evidence. Authorities such as the yoga scholar Elliott Goldberg have described it as the bible of modern yoga; the book has sold over three million copies, and has been translated into at least 23 languages.

Iyengar Yoga became an institution with the 1975 founding of the Ramamani Iyengar Memorial Yoga Institute in Pune, named in memory of his wife. A further major step was the founding of the first of many institutes abroad, the Iyengar Yoga Institute (IYI) in Maida Vale, London, in 1983. The old IYI building was replaced in 1994, and the new one was officially opened by Iyengar in person in 1997. Iyengar Yoga had however been taught in London before that, in evening classes run by the Inner London Education Authority starting in 1968. From the start, Iyengar personally assessed the quality of the teaching every year.

The first Iyengar Yoga Institute in America was founded in San Francisco in 1976 by Mary Dunn, Judith Lasater, and others; Iyengar visited the area that year. Further Iyengar Yoga Institutes have been opened in 1984 in Los Angeles, and in 1987 in New York. National Iyengar Yoga Associations have been created in Argentina, Australia, Austria, Belgium, Canada, Czechia, Chile, China, Denmark, France, Germany, Israel, Italy, Japan, the Netherlands, Mexico, Poland, Russia, Spain, South Africa, Sweden, Switzerland, the United States and New Zealand. The mission of these national associations is to promote the art, science, and philosophy of yoga according to the teachings of B.K.S. Iyengar.

== Style ==
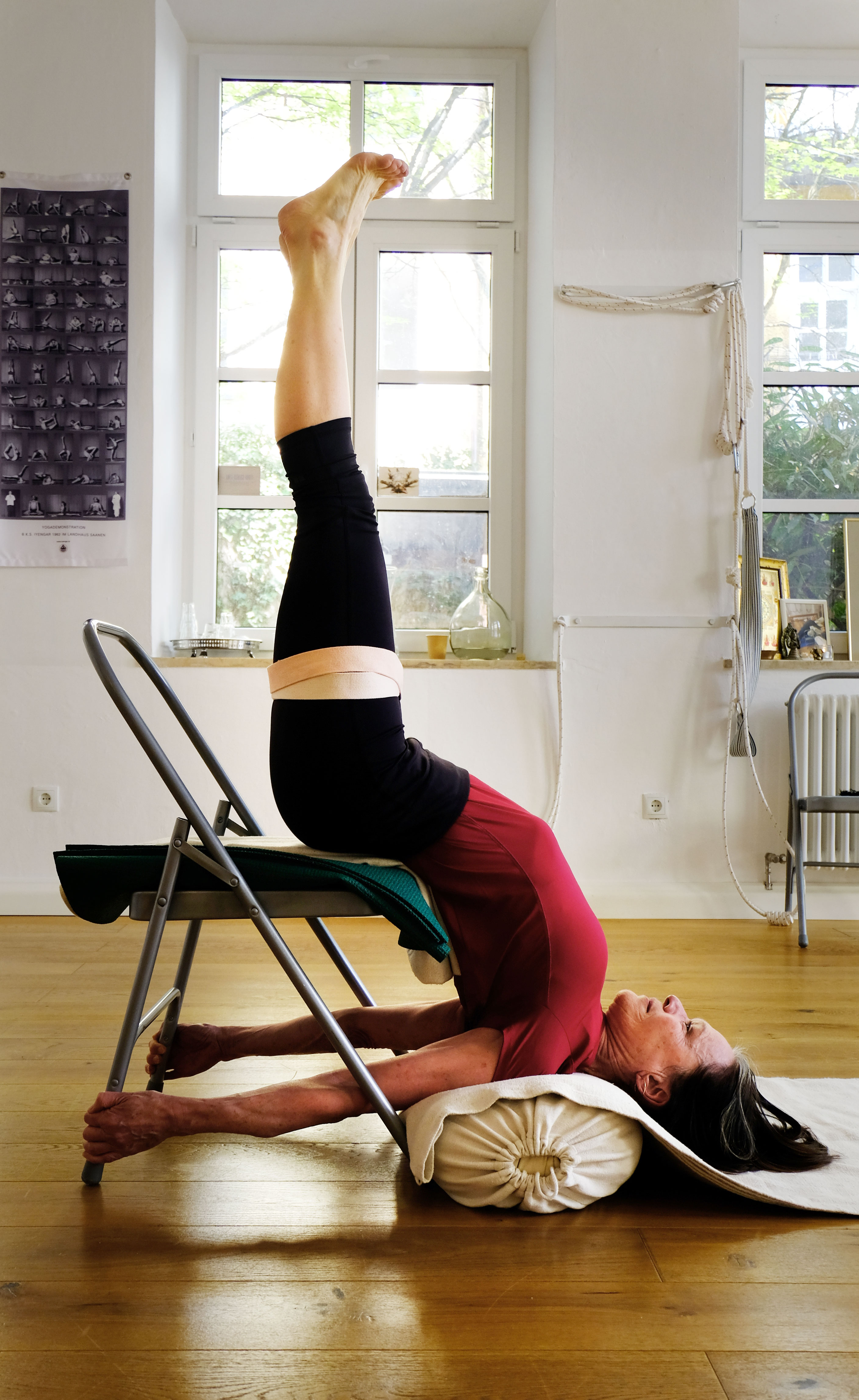
Sarvangasana with a chair, belt, blanket and bolster in a therapeutic use of yoga

Iyengar Yoga is a form of yoga as exercise with a focus on the structural alignment of the physical body through the practice of asanas. It differs from other styles of yoga in three ways: precision, sequence and use of props.

- Precision is sought in body alignment in every asana.
- The sequences in which asanas are practiced is considered important in achieving the desired result.
- Iyengar Yoga led the use of props, designing suitable means to assist practitioners.

According to the Iyengar Yoga Institute, unlike more experiential approaches where students are encouraged to independently "find their way" to the asanas by imitating the teacher, an Iyengar Yoga class is precise, with misalignments and errors actively explained and corrected. It states that the style "emphasises precision and alignment", and prioritises correct movement over quantity, i.e. moving a small amount in the right direction is preferred to moving more but in other directions. Postures are held for a relatively long period of time compared to other schools of yoga; this allows the muscles to relax and lengthen, and encourages awareness in the pose. Props including belts, blocks and blankets are freely used to assist students in correct working in the asanas.

The New Yorker writes that Iyengar Yoga is characterized by great attention to detail and precise focus on body alignment. Iyengar pioneered the use of "props" such as cushions, benches, blocks, straps and sand bags, which function as aids allowing beginners to experience asanas more easily and fully than might otherwise be possible without several years of practice. Props also allow elderly, injured, tired or ill students to experience the benefits of a wider variety of asanas via fully "supported" methods requiring less muscular effort.

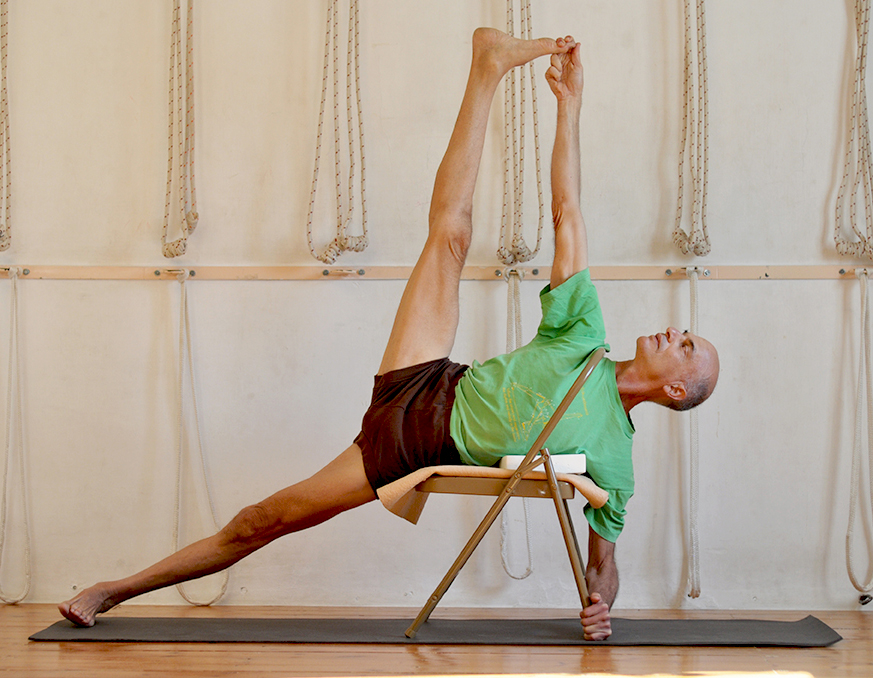
Vasisthasana using props

Yoga Journal notes that in contrast to other styles, beginners in Iyengar Yoga are introduced early on to standing poses (such as Trikonasana and Virabhadrasana), executed with careful attention to detail. For example, in Trikonasana, the feet are often jumped apart to a wide stance, the forward foot is turned out, and the centre of the forward heel is exactly aligned with the centre of the arch of the other foot.

The New York Times writes that Iyengar Yoga is distinctive in its diversity of sequencing and choice of asanas. This, suggests Carrie Owerko, an Iyengar Yoga teacher, helps reduce injury. Owerko states that the style emphasises the inversion poses, headstand (Sirsasana) and shoulderstand (Sarvangasana), more than other styles, "insist[ing] on a yoga blanket to prevent overstretching of the neck area". In Owerko's words, "Iyengar yoga is very cautious and mindful."

Dunn stated that "People have incorrectly pigeonholed Iyengar Yoga into 'alignment, technique, props' rather than 'learning, experiencing, integrating'—which I think are the real words".

== Training, certification, and standards ==
Until 2019, Iyengar teachers had to complete at least two years of yoga teacher training for the introductory certificate, with additional assessments for intermediate and senior levels of certification, potentially entailing a decade or more of training. The system was replaced from 2019, with teachers required to have attended Iyengar Yoga classes for three years before starting training; they are then required to undergo at least three years of mentoring before assessment.

Practitioners in the West can attend the Ramamani Iyengar Memorial Institute in Pune, Maharashtra, India once they have practised yoga for eight years. A "Protocol" governs attendance at the Pune institute.

In 2019, the Iyengar National Association of the United States decertified one of its most senior teachers, Manouso Manos, on grounds of sexual assault, and updated its ethics standards based on the Yamas and Niyamas in the Yoga Sutras of Patanjali as a result.

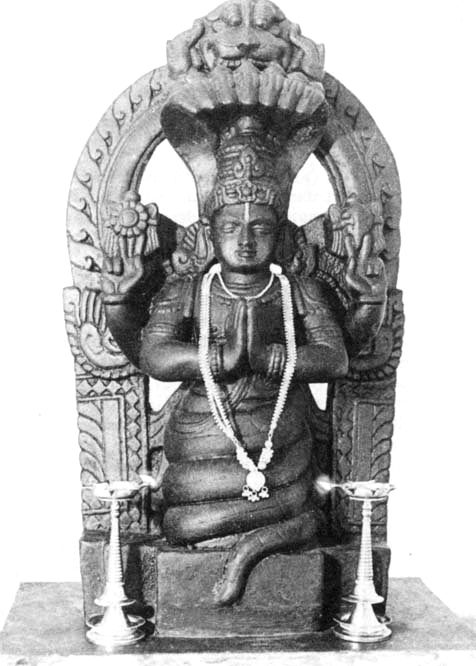
A statue of Patanjali, author of the Yoga Sutras, as Adi Shesa, the serpent god

== Invocation to Patanjali ==
Iyengar Yoga (like Iyengar's Light on Yoga) has the following invocation to Patanjali:

Sanskrit	IAST	Translation
योगेन चित्तस्य पदेन वाचां। मलं शरीरस्य च वैद्यकेन॥ योऽपाकरोत्तं प्रवरं मुनीनां। पतञ्जलिं प्राञ्जलिरानतोऽस्मि॥	yogena cittasya padena vācāṁ malaṁ śarīrasya ca vaidyakena yo'pākarottaṁ pravaraṁ munīnāṁ patañjaliṁ prāñjalirānato'smi	Let us bow before the noblest of sages Patanjali, who gave yoga for serenity and sanctity of mind, grammar for clarity and purity of speech, and medicine for perfection of health.

The yoga scholar Suzanne Newcombe notes that despite the references to Patanjali, Iyengar did not ask students to adopt any set of beliefs. She describes Iyengar as trying to "teach an embodied experience of concentration and unity of body, breath, mind and soul", focussing on "asana while teaching a method accessing all the different aspects of yoga within this single limb."

== See also ==
- Yoga as therapy#Long COVID - supported asanas to assist recovery
- Yoga the Iyengar Way – book by Mira and Shyam Mehta of the London Iyengar Yoga Institute
- Yoga for women - promoted by Geeta Iyengar

== Sources ==
- Goldberg, Elliott (2016). The Path of Modern Yoga : the history of an embodied spiritual practice. Inner Traditions. ISBN 978-1-62055-567-5. OCLC 926062252.
- Iyengar, B. K. S. (1991) [1966]. Light on Yoga: Yoga Dipika. Thorsons. ISBN 978-1855381667.
- Jain, Andrea (2015). Selling Yoga: from Counterculture to Pop Culture. Oxford University Press. ISBN 978-0-19-939024-3. OCLC 878953765.
- Mehta, Silva; Mehta, Mira; Mehta, Shyam (1990). Yoga: The Iyengar Way. Dorling-Kindersley. ISBN 978-0863184208.
- Newcombe, Suzanne (2019). Yoga in Britain: Stretching Spirituality and Educating Yogis. Bristol, England: Equinox Publishing. ISBN 978-1-78179-661-0.
- Schneider, Carrie (2003). American Yoga: The paths and practices of America's greatest yoga masters. Barnes & Noble. ISBN 978-0760745588.
