= Forrest Yoga =

School of modern yoga

- Founder: Ana T. Forrest
- Established: 1982

Practice emphasises
- breath, strength, integrity, spirit

Related schools
- Sivananda Yoga, Iyengar Yoga, Ashtanga (vinyasa) yoga, Hatha Yoga

Forrest Yoga is a style of yoga as exercise. It was created by and named for Ana T. Forrest in 1982. It is known for "its long holding of positions, emphasis on abdominal core work, and standing series that can go on for 20 poses on each side". Reputed for its intensity, the style emphasizes connecting to one's feelings in order to work through physical and emotional trauma.

== Description ==
Ana Forrest derived her practice from some aspects of Sivananda yoga, along with attention to alignment and use of props found in Iyengar yoga, and the heat and flowing sequences of Ashtanga (vinyasa) yoga. As the style evolved, she created a number of additional poses and sequences adapted to modern society, such as wrist stretches to prevent and relieve carpal tunnel syndrome. She also created shoulder shrugs to relieve tension and loosen the upper back, abdominal exercises to tone internal organs and strengthen the lower back, and some poses using a folded over and rolled up yoga mat. Forrest personally practices aspects of Hatha yoga not widely taught in modern yoga as exercise; her skill at the shatkarma nauli is featured on the Nauli.org site.

Forrest Yoga classes are conducted in a warm room (85 °F, 29 °C) and begin with pranayama, then move through seated poses and abdominal muscle exercises before arriving at the "hot part" of the class that might involve sun salutations, standing poses, inversions, backbends and other asanas that build up to the more challenging "apex" poses. The poses are sustained, intensively and contemplatively, sometimes for 10 deep breaths, sometimes for several minutes.

== Philosophy ==
Forrest Yoga's vision and mission, inspired by the life of Black Elk, a healer and Medicine Man of the Oglala Lakota Sioux, is "to mend the rainbow hoop of the people". In this style, healing is meant to extend to the emotional body, directing the breath into affected parts of the body to release emotions. Forrest was certified as a yoga teacher when aged 18. She is trained in Native American medicine, reiki, and regression therapy. She has studied alternative healing techniques including homeopathy, naturopathy, reflexology, shiatsu, and chiropractic, all of which, she states, inform her work.

The style claims to be founded on four principles, or "pillars":

1. Breath, to help connect in feeling with one's body and ignite passion for living
2. Strength, via intense core sequences and long holds of poses that generate heat and heighten the senses
3. Integrity, in working with the edges of one's practice, particularly around physical and emotional injuries, developing tools to deal with fear and struggle
4. Spirit, to create a sense of freedom and "courage to walk as your Spirit dictates"

== Basic moves ==
Forrest Yoga's physical practice uses some "basic moves" in every pose up until Savasana. Many of these moves resemble those practiced in other yoga styles, such as Ujjayi breath and tucking the tailbone, while others are unique to this style, particularly the practice of relaxing the neck and wrapping the shoulders. Overall emphasis is on breath work and core strengthening.

1. Active Hands and Feet, spreading the hand bones wide and extending the fingers fully, and pressing through heels and balls of feet and lifting the toes
2. Tuck Tailbone, to lengthen tailbone downward and relieve pressure on the lower back
3. Telescope Ribs, placing hands on lower part of rib cage and inhaling to lift ribcage away from belly
4. Expand Ribs
5. Wrap Shoulders
6. Relax Neck
7. Deep breathing
