= Viparita Dandasana =

Inverted back-bending posture in modern yoga

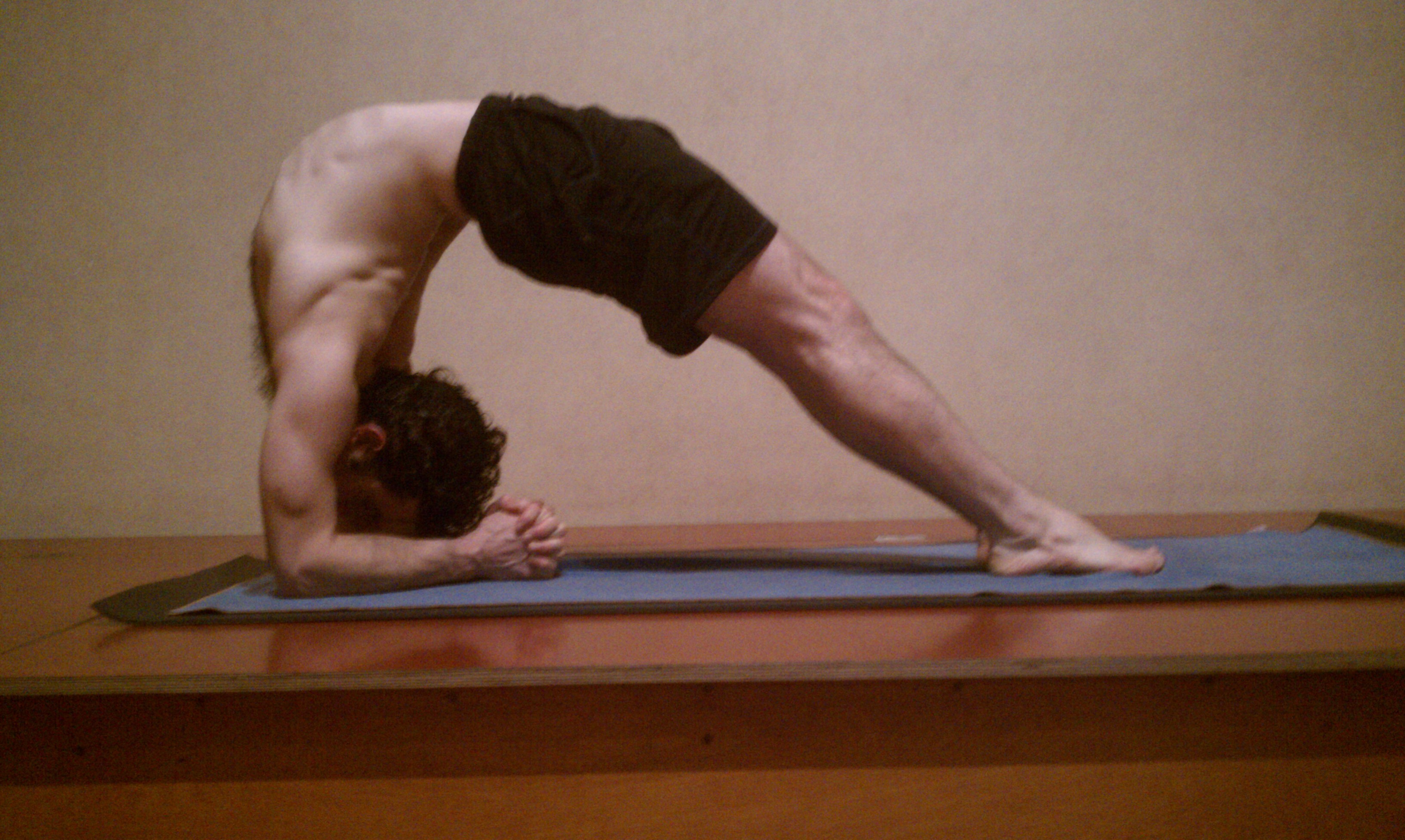
Inverted Staff Pose

Viparita Dandasana (Sanskrit: विपरीत दण्डासन, IAST: Viparīta Daṇḍāsana) or Inverted Staff Pose is an inverted back-bending asana in modern yoga as exercise. It may be performed with both feet on the ground, or with one leg raised straight up.

== Etymology and origins ==
The name of this asana comes from Sanskrit विपरीत viparīta, "inverted", दण्ड daṇḍa, "staff" symbolising authority and the devotee's prostration, and आसन āsana, "posture" or "seat". The variants are named for Sanskrit एक eka, "one" or द्वि dvi, "two", and पाद pada, "foot".

The asana is not found in medieval Hatha yoga texts. It is described in the 20th century by two of Krishnamacharya's pupils, Pattabhi Jois in his Ashtanga (vinyasa) yoga, and B. K. S. Iyengar in his Light on Yoga.

== Description ==
The asana is entered from lying on the back. The hands and feet are positioned close to the body as for upwards bow, and the body is lifted so the crown of the head can be rested on the floor. The legs are then straightened into the two-legged pose, Dvi Pada Viparita Dandasana, and the hands are arranged holding the head as for yoga headstand (Sirsasana). Alternatively, advanced students can enter the asana from Sirsasana, arching the back, lowering the legs to the floor, and then straightening the legs.

The one-legged pose, Eka Pada Viparita Dandasana, can then be entered by raising one leg; the leg is held stretched straight out vertically. Advanced students can leave the asana by returning to Sirsasana. This asana is in the Advanced A Series of Ashtanga Vinyasa Yoga.

== Variations ==
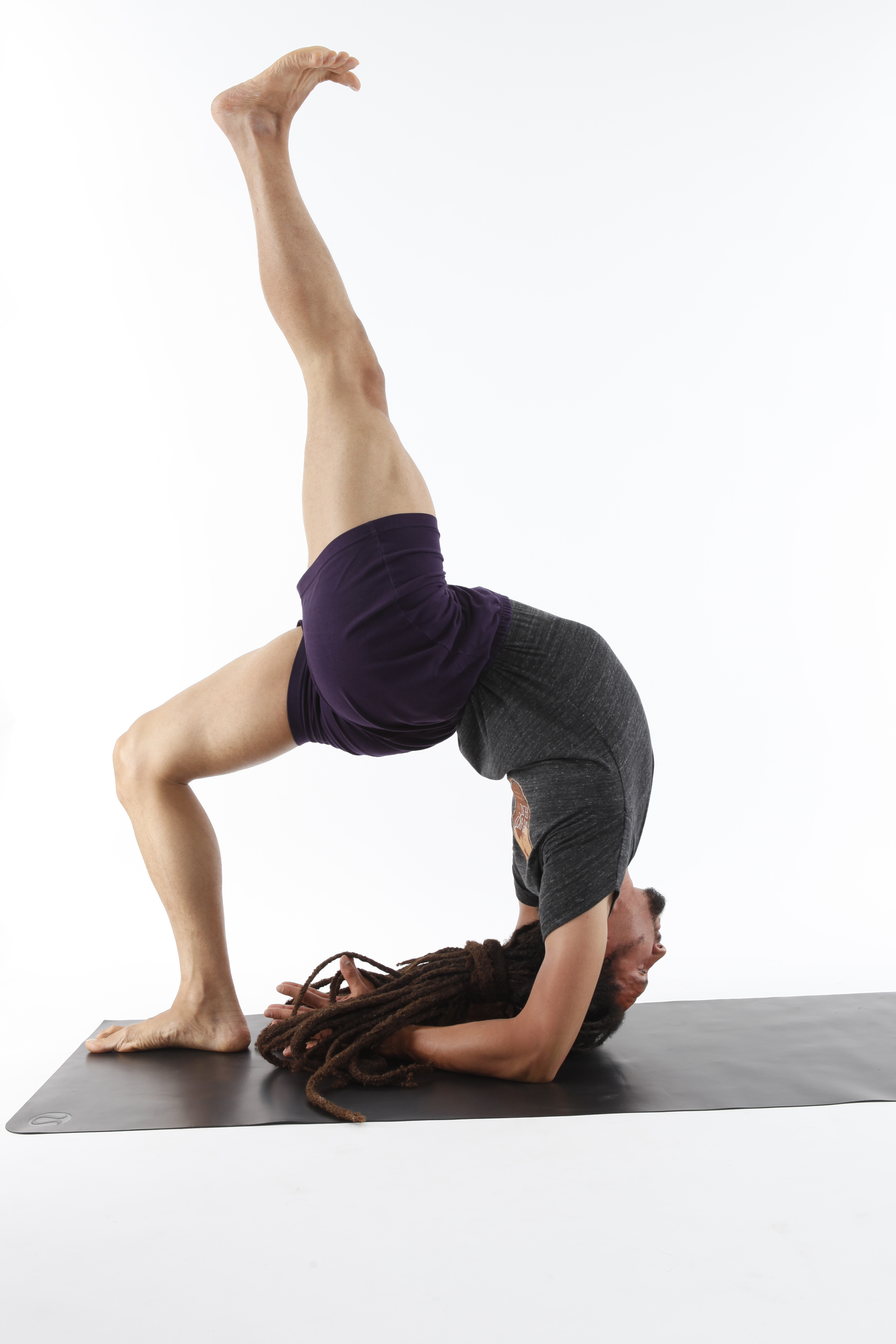
Eka Pada Viparita Dandasana

The asana can be practised on an open-backed chair, its seat padded with a folded blanket. The asana is entered by sitting with the feet through the back of the chair, holding the chair's back, and leaning back into a reclining position with the back supported on the seat of the chair. A bolster or folded blankets may be used to support the head and relax the body if the neck feels compressed.

A more strenuous asana for advanced students is Viparita Dandasana II, where the feet are brought towards the head until the ankles are grasped by the hands; the head is lifted. A variant of that is Eka Pada Viparita Dandasana II, with one leg lifted to point straight up.

Chakra Bandhasana has the forearms on the floor and the hands grasping the heels.

== Sources ==
- Iyengar, B. K. S. (1979) [1966]. Light on Yoga: Yoga Dipika. Unwin Paperbacks. ISBN 978-1855381667.
- Mehta, Silva; Mehta, Mira; Mehta, Shyam (1990). Yoga: The Iyengar Way. Dorling Kindersley.
- Sjoman, Norman E. (1999) [1996]. The Yoga Tradition of the Mysore Palace. Abhinav Publications. ISBN 81-7017-389-2.
