= Yogapaṭṭa =

Prop used in Indian meditation

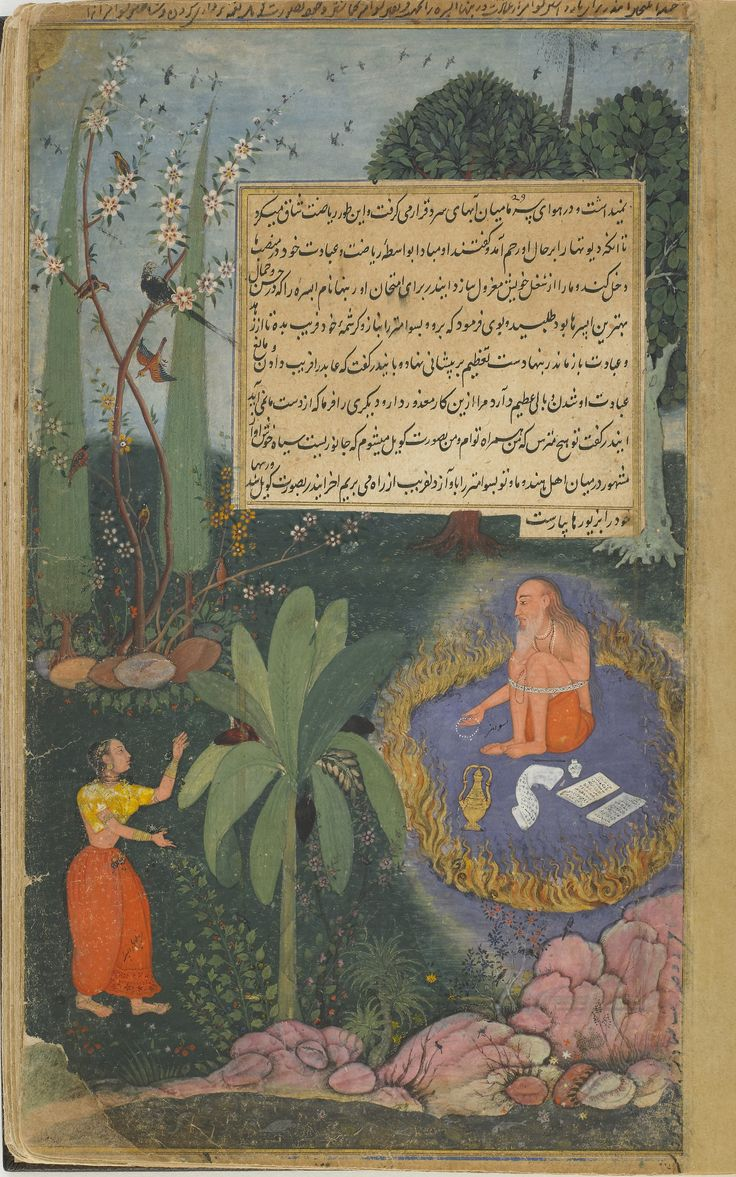
Vishvamitra practices his austerities, late 16th century. The seated figure is shown using a yogapaṭṭa.

A yogapaṭṭa ('yoga-strap' or 'yoga-cloth') is a material prop used in the practice of yoga or meditation by yogis, siddhas, and ascetics. It consists of a cloth strap or belt that fixes one's body in a certain posture for the purpose of yogic meditation. The cloth was thrown over the back and knees of a meditator, used to keep their limbs in a fixed position. While cross-legged, the legs were bound in a manner so that the knees did not touch the ground, securing a stable posture for long-periods. Swāmī Hariharānanda Āraṇya defined it as being "a strong piece of cloth by which the back and the two legs are tied while squatting" that is used for performing sopāśraya. A yoga-paṭṭaka is a related item that refers to a garment worn during contemplation. The yogic āsana yogapaṭṭāsana ('posture with a yoga strap') is named after the item. References to the item exist in Indian literature, such as the Kṣudrakavastu, the Yoga Sutras of Patanjali (such as the Tattvavaiśāradī and Yogavarttika), and the Dharmaśāstra (such as the Yatidharmasamuccaya, which reveals that gurus ritually gifted a yogapaṭṭa to their students for Vaishnavite Sannyasa). Artistic depictions, including in sculpture and bronzes, of the item exist at locations such as at Sanchi, Mamallapuram, Ellora, Hampi, and in later paintings, such as during the Mughal Empire. The usage of the prop declined in India but survived in use in Nepal and Tibet amongst the Vajrayāna Buddhists. Modern yoga straps (introduced by B. K. S. Iyengar in the 1960s) are a modern reinvention of the same purpose that the ancient yogapaṭṭa served.
