= Yoga brick =

Block used as yoga prop

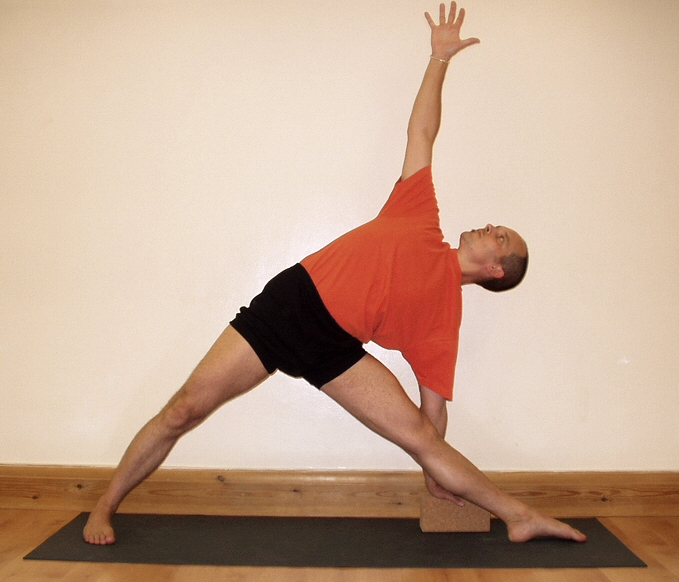
A yoga brick under the supporting hand to encourage correct alignment in Trikonasana (triangle pose) according to the individual's needs. This usage is common in Iyengar Yoga.

A yoga brick or yoga block is a smooth block of wood or of firm but comfortable material, such as hard foam rubber or cork, used as a prop in yoga as exercise.

The use of wooden bricks to assist in alignment was introduced by B. K. S. Iyengar, founder of Iyengar Yoga, and has spread to practices such as Restorative Yoga and Yin Yoga.

== History ==
B. K. S. Iyengar, who founded Iyengar Yoga in the 1970s, introduced the use of yoga props including bricks and straps to assist his students towards correct alignment in the asanas. He recommended that yoga bricks be similar in size to a house brick, 9 x 4.5 x 3 inches (22.5 x 11 x 7.5 cm) in size. Iyengar yoga institutions sell unbranded yoga bricks.

== Considerations ==
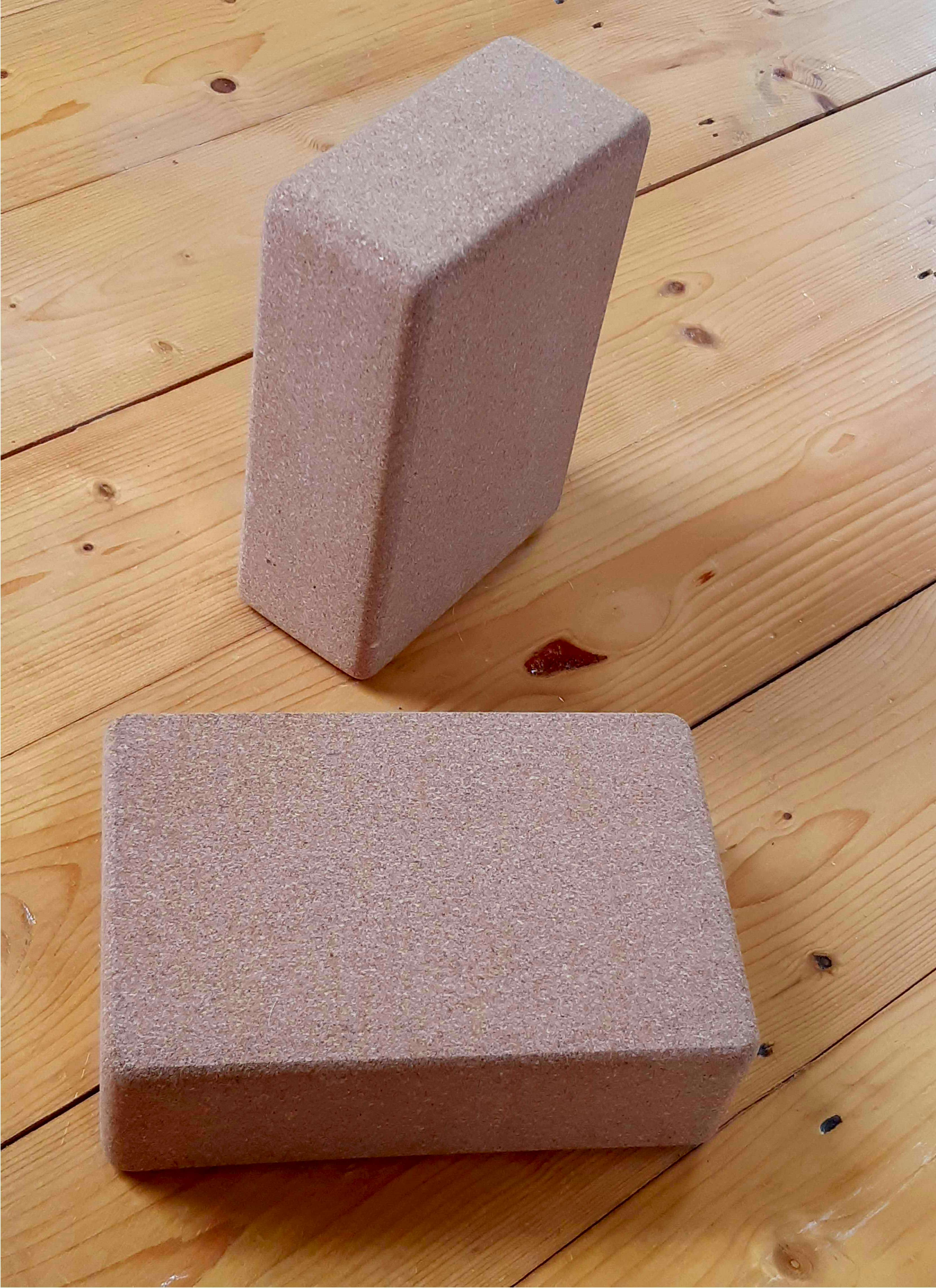
Cork yoga blocks

Yoga bricks are manufactured in a variety of materials, sizes, and colours. Lydia Willgress, writing for The Independent, states that the key considerations are the hardness of the material, which influences the comfort and support they provide; size and weight; and appearance. Some brands, such as Lululemon, provide "motivational messaging" on both the packaging and the actual block.

Practitioners may choose to own only a single block, but some asanas require a block under each hand, or a stack of two blocks, so purchasing a set of two may be practical and economical on shipping costs.

== Materials ==
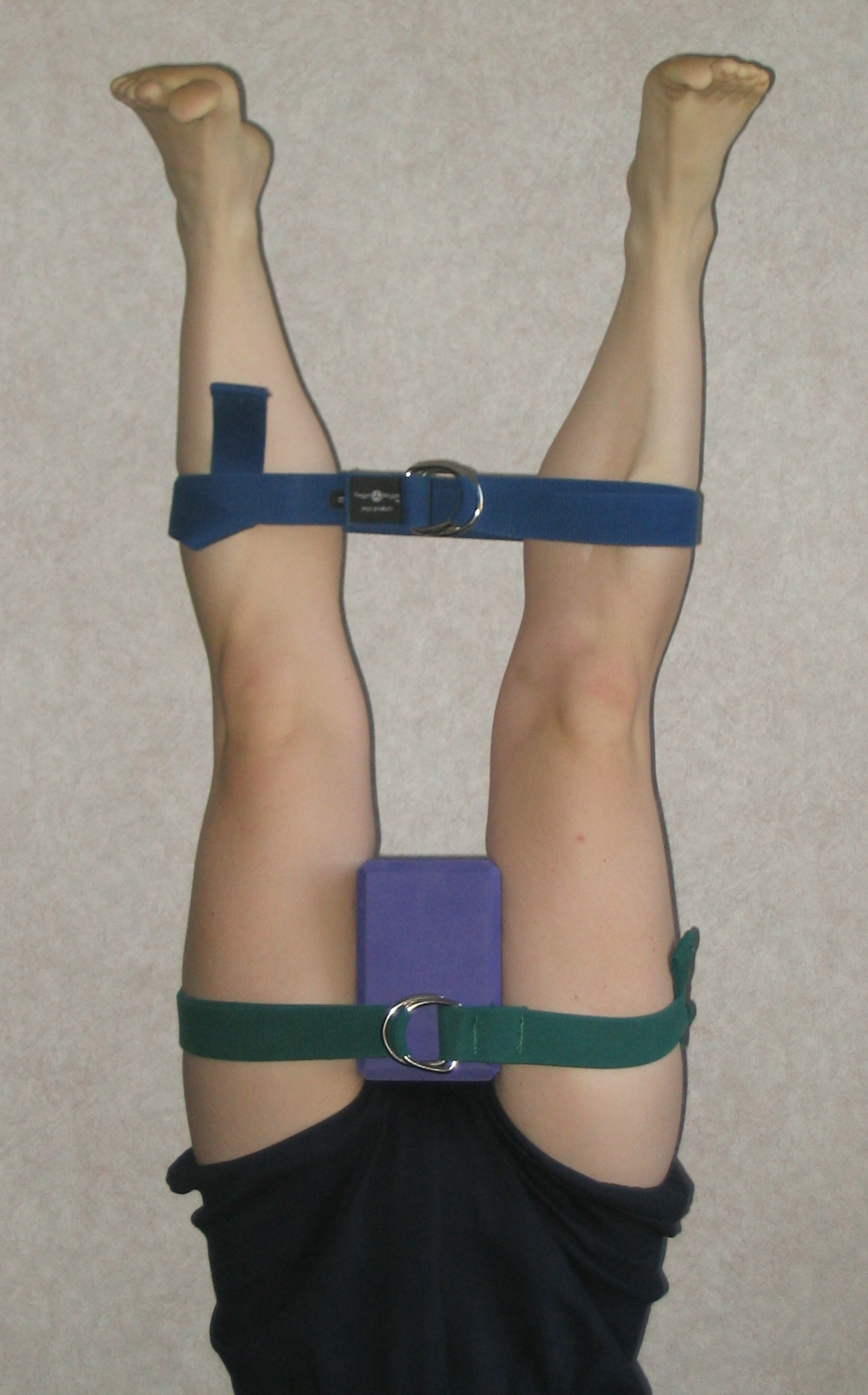
A foam plastic block in a therapeutic use of yoga

The earliest yoga bricks were made of wood, providing excellent support and durability but relatively little comfort. They are hard, often heavy, expensive, and tend to become slippery when wet. These considerations led to the development of yoga bricks in other materials, and to the marketing of hollow wooden blocks, which are lighter but more costly and less durable. Woods used include hardwoods like birch and maple, and softwoods like pine; hardwood blocks are heavier (up to about 2.5 pounds or 1.1 kg) and more durable than those made of softwood. Lightweight wooden blocks made of balsa are available from some manufacturers. Bamboo blocks are durable, but relatively expensive.

Cork is a natural material, making it an attractive choice for yoga practitioners concerned about ecological impact. It provides good grip, and since it is naturally waterproof, it usefully resists absorbing sweat. All the same, it does eventually absorb odours, and it tends to crumble with use.

Foam plastic or rubber blocks (often EVA foam) are lighter than cork, ranging between 200 and 400 grams (7 to 14 ounces), so are convenient to carry around, and they are often inexpensive, so they are widely used by yoga studios. Those of relatively soft foam are comfortable to sit on, but provide less support for other parts of the body as may be needed in the more advanced asanas.

Manufacturers such as Manduka make recycled foam blocks, offering the combination of a light and strong prop with a low ecological impact.

== Size and shape ==
The yoga teacher Benna Crawford notes that brick and block are usually synonyms for the same yoga props, but that manufacturers sometimes use "brick" for a slim one, about 2 inches (5 cm) thick, and "block" for a thicker one of 3 inches (7.5 cm) and above.

Most yoga bricks are cuboidal blocks, often with chamfered edges for comfort. Well-designed blocks have unequal length, width, and thickness, offering three different heights for different uses in the yoga class. Some manufacturers have explored other shapes; for example, Yogamatters make an oval block, comfortable for sitting but less versatile as a support.

== Applications ==
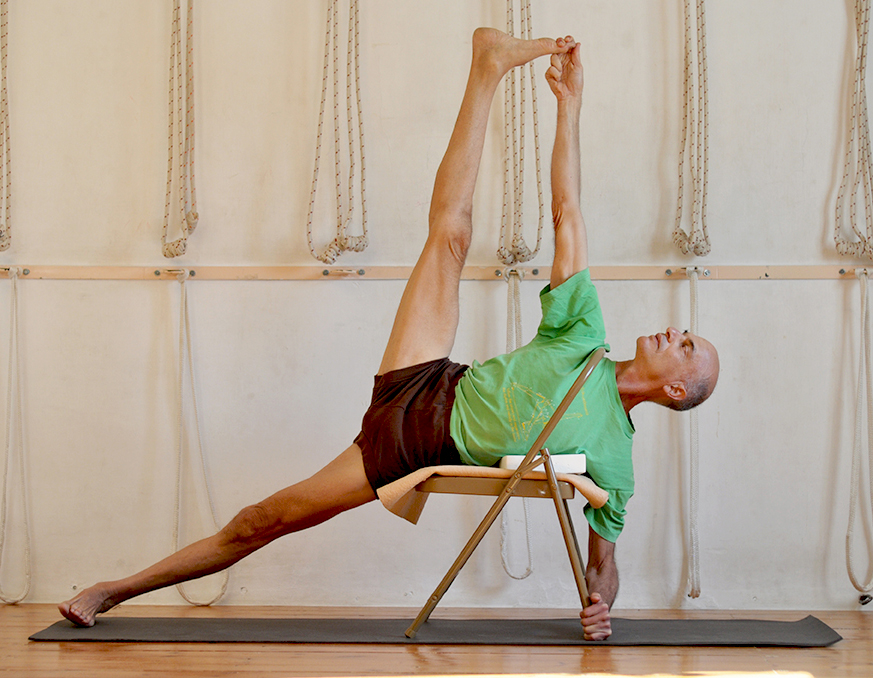
The use of props including a thin yoga block, yoga mats, and a folding chair, demonstrated in Vasisthasana

The yoga teacher and author Candace Moore writes that yoga bricks can be useful for both beginners and advanced practitioners. Beginners can benefit from supporting their hand in asanas such as Trikonasana, Triangle pose, sitting on a block in a forward bend such as Paschimottanasana, or supporting one buttock in Eka Pāda Rājakapotāsana (King Pigeon pose), giving a beneficial forward tilt to the pelvis. Moore suggests that a pair of blocks can be used to support the knees in the seated Baddha Konasana, Cobbler's pose, while practitioners can work towards more advanced poses using a block under each hand to practice arm balances such as in preparation for Astavakrasana. Similarly, in Iyengar Yoga, a pair of yoga bricks can be used under the feet in Urdhva Dhanurasana (Upwards Bow pose) to enable the lower trunk to lift better, or the hands can be placed on yoga bricks.

Yin Yoga (founded c. 1975) uses props such as blocks to help get sensation into whichever area is of concern; the purpose may be to increase stress in an area, to reduce stress where it is not wanted, to make some poses accessible to the practitioner, to provide enough support to allow the muscles to let go, and to make poses more comfortable, permitting them to be held for longer. The Yin Yoga teacher Sarah Powers explains that "When the bones feel supported, the muscles can relax;" an example is the use of blocks to support the knees in Butterfly pose, the Yin equivalent of Baddha Konasana.

Restorative Yoga (founded c. 2007) uses blocks extensively, for example arranging them under a bolster to create a ramp or to raise a part of the body.

== See also ==
- Yoga mat
- Yoga pants
