= Mary Dunn (yoga) =

American Yoga Instructor

Mary Dunn in Pune in 1978, being instructed by B. K. S. Iyengar

Mary Louise Palmer Dunn (2 June 1942 – 4 September 2008) was an American instructor in Iyengar Yoga, and a founding member of its institutes in America. She was seen as a teacher's teacher within the tradition.

== Life and career ==
Dunn was born in Ann Arbor, Michigan on 2 June 1942 to Mary and William B. Palmer in a house designed for them by Frank Lloyd Wright. After graduating University of Wisconsin–Madison in 1964, she married Roger Dunn in 1965 and moved to San Francisco, California in 1967. Her mother was a student of B. K. S. Iyengar and helped bring him to the United States in 1973. She went to Pune each year to study directly under Iyengar.

Dunn began learning under Iyengar in 1974, eventually becoming a founding director of the Iyengar Yoga National Association of the United States and a co-founder of three Iyengar Yoga Institutes in America, namely San Francisco, New York, and San Diego.

Jenny Snick, in Yoga Journal in 1983, wrote that Dunn looked like a woman living to her potential, describing her body as strong, compact, and graceful, with evident flexibility in every movement, filling the silence of the yoga studio with "her warmth and liveliness".

Holly Hammond, writing in Yoga Journal, described Dunn as "one of the earliest American Iyengar Yoga teachers", one considered as a "teacher's teacher" because she trained many other Iyengar Yoga instructors. LA Yoga magazine called her "the star that lived among us"; it reported that Iyengar described her as "a clean and clear person".

Dunn died of peritoneal cancer in Scarsdale, New York.

== Sources ==
- Hammond, Holly (5 April 2017) [2007]. "Meet the Innovators: Mary Dunn". Yoga Journal.
- IYA (2007). "Mary Dunn profile". Iyengar Yoga Association. Archived from the original on 13 September 2008.
- Schneider, Carrie (2003). American Yoga : The paths and practices of America's greatest yoga masters. Barnes & Noble. ISBN 978-0760745588.
- Snick, Jenny (September 1983). "The Teaching of Mary Dunn". Yoga Journal: 45–48. ISSN 0191-0965.
- Sulcas, Roslyn (9 September 2008). "Mary Dunn, Yoga Instructor, Is Dead at 66". The New York Times.
- Walford, Lisa (27 December 2008). "In Memorium: Mary Dunn, In Gratitude".
