= Chakrasana =

Standing back-bending posture in hatha yoga

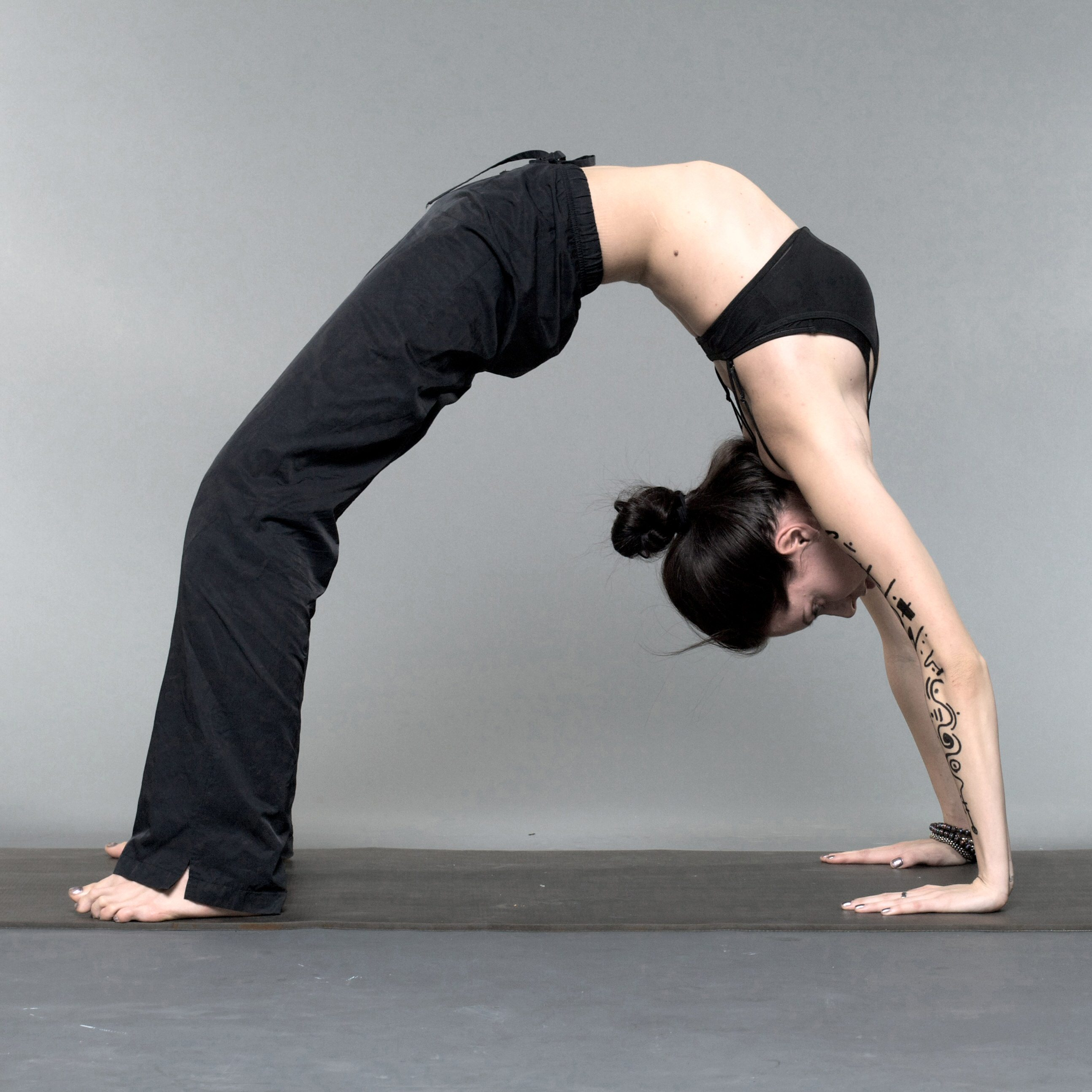
Chakrasana

Chakrasana (Sanskrit: चक्रासन, romanized: Cakrāsana, lit. 'Wheel Pose') or Urdhva Dhanurasana (Sanskrit: ऊर्ध्वधनुरासन, romanized: Ūrdhvadhanurāsana, lit. 'Upward-Facing Bow Pose') is a backbending asana in yoga as exercise. The one-legged variant is often chosen by yoga practitioners who wish to advertise themselves.

== Etymology and origins ==
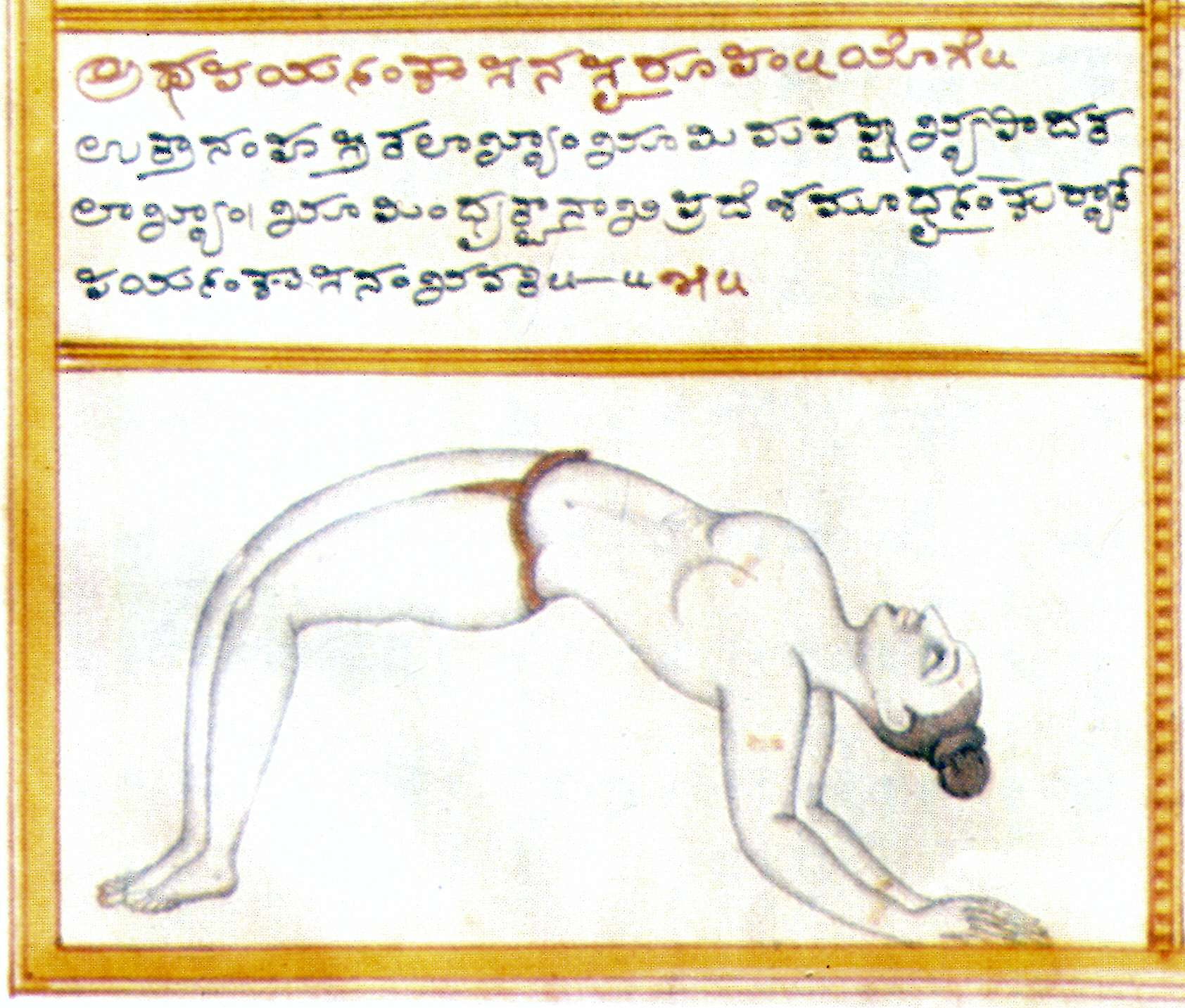
Paryaṇkāsana in Sritattvanidhi

The name Chakrasana comes from the Sanskrit words चक्र chakra, "wheel", and आसन āsana, "posture" or "seat". The name Urdhva Dhanurasana comes from the Sanskrit ऊर्ध्व urdhva, upwards, and धनु dhanura, a bow (for shooting arrows).

The pose is illustrated in the 19th century Sritattvanidhi as Paryaṇkāsana, Couch Pose.

== Description ==
In the general form of the asana, the practitioner has hands and feet on the floor, and the abdomen arches up toward the sky. It may be entered from a supine position or through a less rigorous supine backbend, such as Setu Bandha Sarvangasana (Bridge Pose). Some advanced practitioners can move into Wheel Pose by "dropping back" from Tadasana (Mountain Pose), or by standing with the back to a wall, reaching arms overhead and walking hands down the wall toward the floor. Advanced practitioners may also follow wheel with any of its variations (listed below), or with other backbends, such as Dwi Pada Viparita Dandasana, or by pushing back up to stand in Tadasana.

Preparatory poses are backbends such as Salabhasana (Locust), variants of Bhujangasana (Cobra, Sphinx), and Dhanurasana (Bow).

Counter poses are forward bends including Paschimottanasana (Seated Forward Bend) and Balasana (Child's Pose).

== Variations ==
Many variations of the pose are possible, including:

- Eka Pada Urdhva Dhanurasana (One-Legged Upward Bow or One-Legged Wheel): one leg is lifted straight up into the air.
- Camatkarasana (Wild Thing Pose) has one arm lifted and the opposite leg straightened.
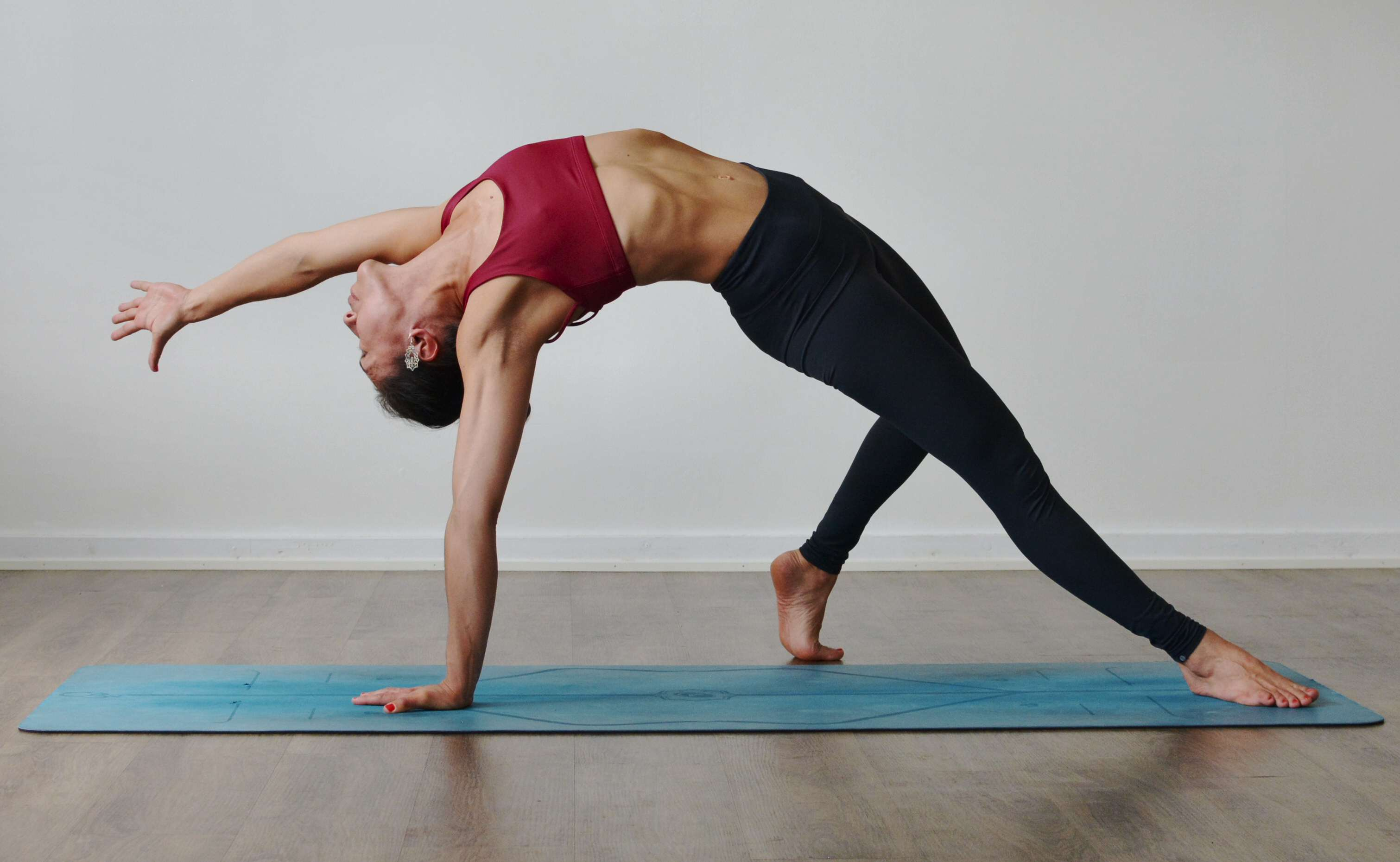
Camatkarasana, Wild Thing Pose, a modern posture between Vasisthasana and Chakrasana

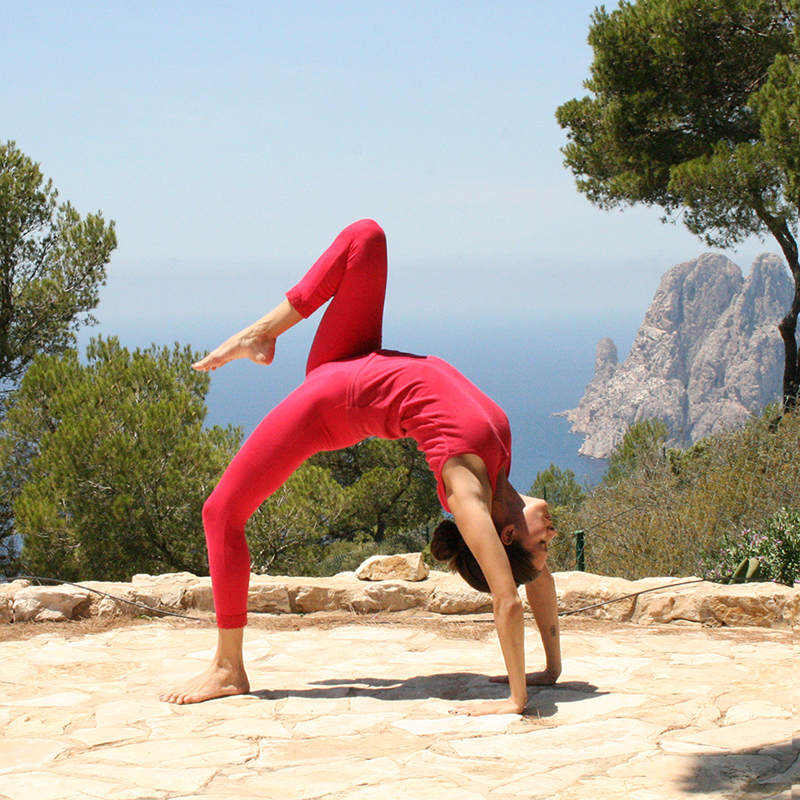
Russian yoga teacher Nina Mel, moving into Eka Pada Urdhva Dhanurasana

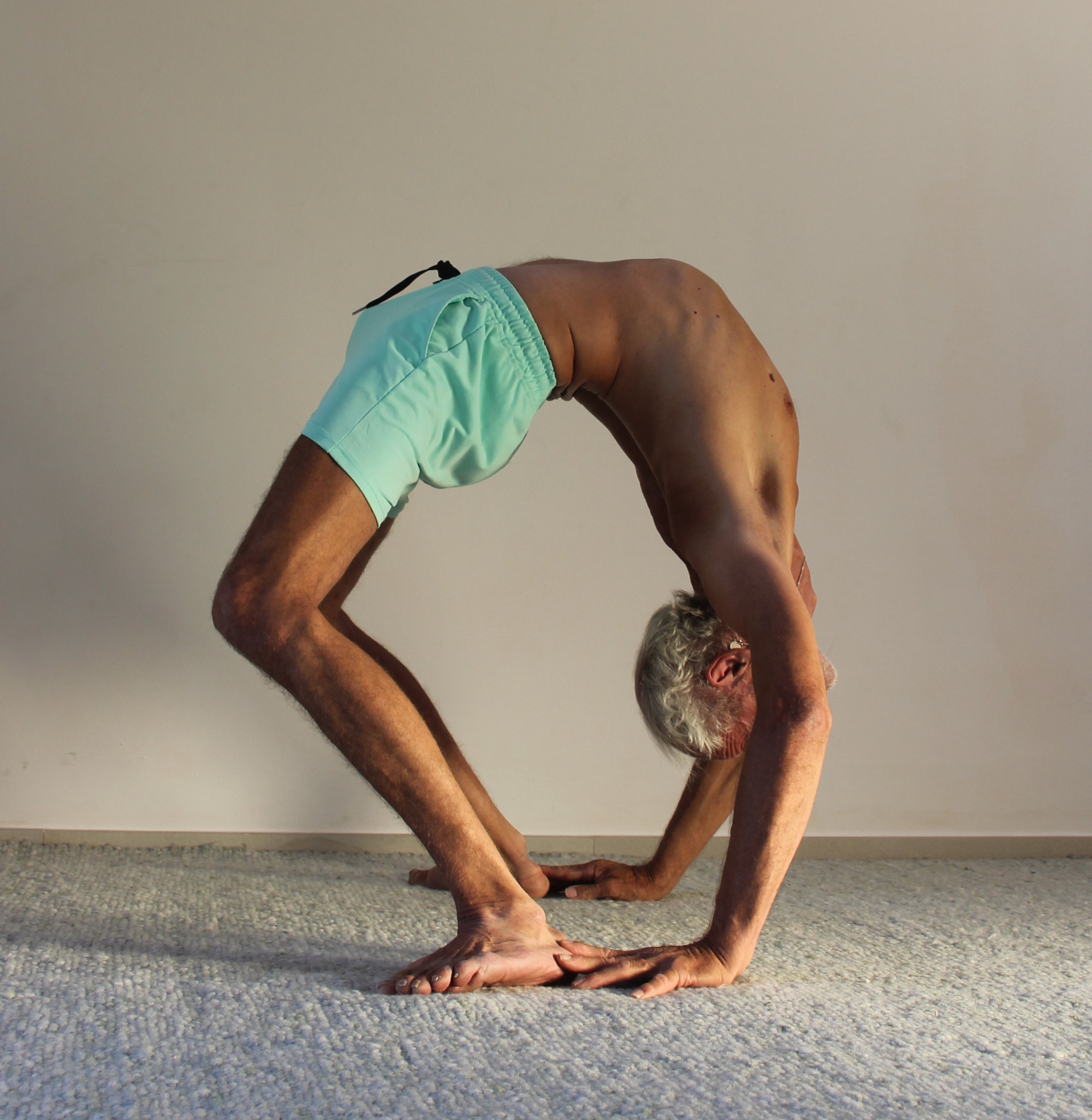
Advanced version of chakrasana

== Learning the pose ==
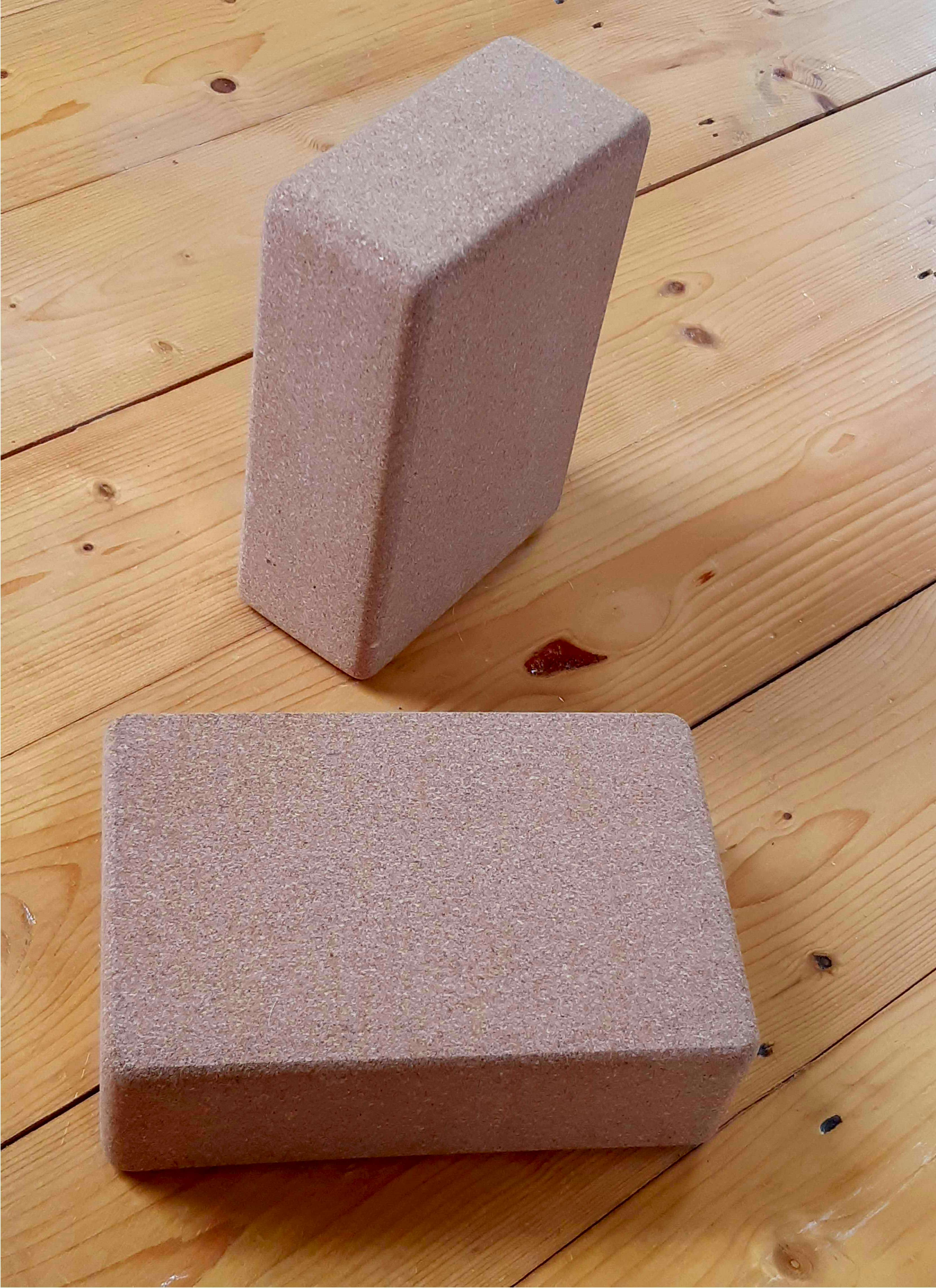
A pair of yoga bricks can be used to support the hands; slipping can be prevented by placing the bricks against a wall.

People with tight shoulders or hips may be unable to move into Chakrasana. They can practise the pose using supports such as a pair of yoga bricks placed against a wall under the hands or feet. A mat can be spread over the bricks to prevent slipping. Angled blocks may be more comfortable for the hands, as the slope reduces the strain on the wrists; alternatively, yoga bricks can be propped up on the wall's skirting board or other blocks. In a class, an assistant can stand by the practitioner's head (in place of the wall); the practitioner can then hold the assistant's ankles, and the assistant can hold the practitioner's shoulders.

The pose can be practised against a wall by standing a pace away from the wall, and facing away from it, with the feet about hip width apart. With the knees bent, the arms reach up and then back to the wall, and the head is leant back. If comfortable, the hands may be walked a little further down the wall and the arms and knees straightened.

== In culture ==
On its 40th anniversary, Yoga Journal recalled seven ways it had covered Urdhva Dhanurasana, including a cover of Iyengar Yoga teacher Rama Jyoti Vernon doing the pose in its first year, 1975 and Angela Farmer doing the one-legged variant in 1982. The pose is often chosen by yoga practitioners who wish to advertise themselves: the Welsh author Holly Williams, writing about the commercialisation of yoga in The Independent, commented that she had "unfollowed [several] people on Instagram whose artful shots of their Lycra-clad one-legged wheel poses come with a barrage of hashtags (#fitspo #yogaeverydamnday #beagoddess)."

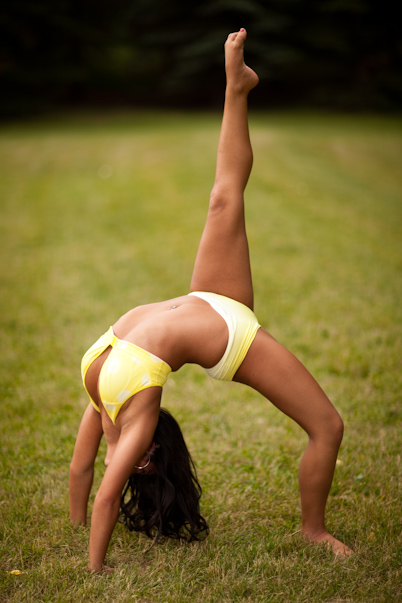
Yoga in advertising: pose by a Lululemon yoga model

== See also ==
- Viparita Dandasana, Inverted Staff pose, has the back similarly arched but the forearms on the ground.
- Bridge (gymnastics)

== Sources ==
- Iyengar, B. K. S. (1979) [1966]. Light on Yoga: Yoga Dipika. Unwin Paperbacks. ISBN 978-1855381667.
- Sjoman, Norman E. (1999) [1996]. The Yoga Tradition of the Mysore Palace. Abhinav Publications. ISBN 81-7017-389-2.
