= Utthita Vasisthasana =

Balancing posture in modern yoga

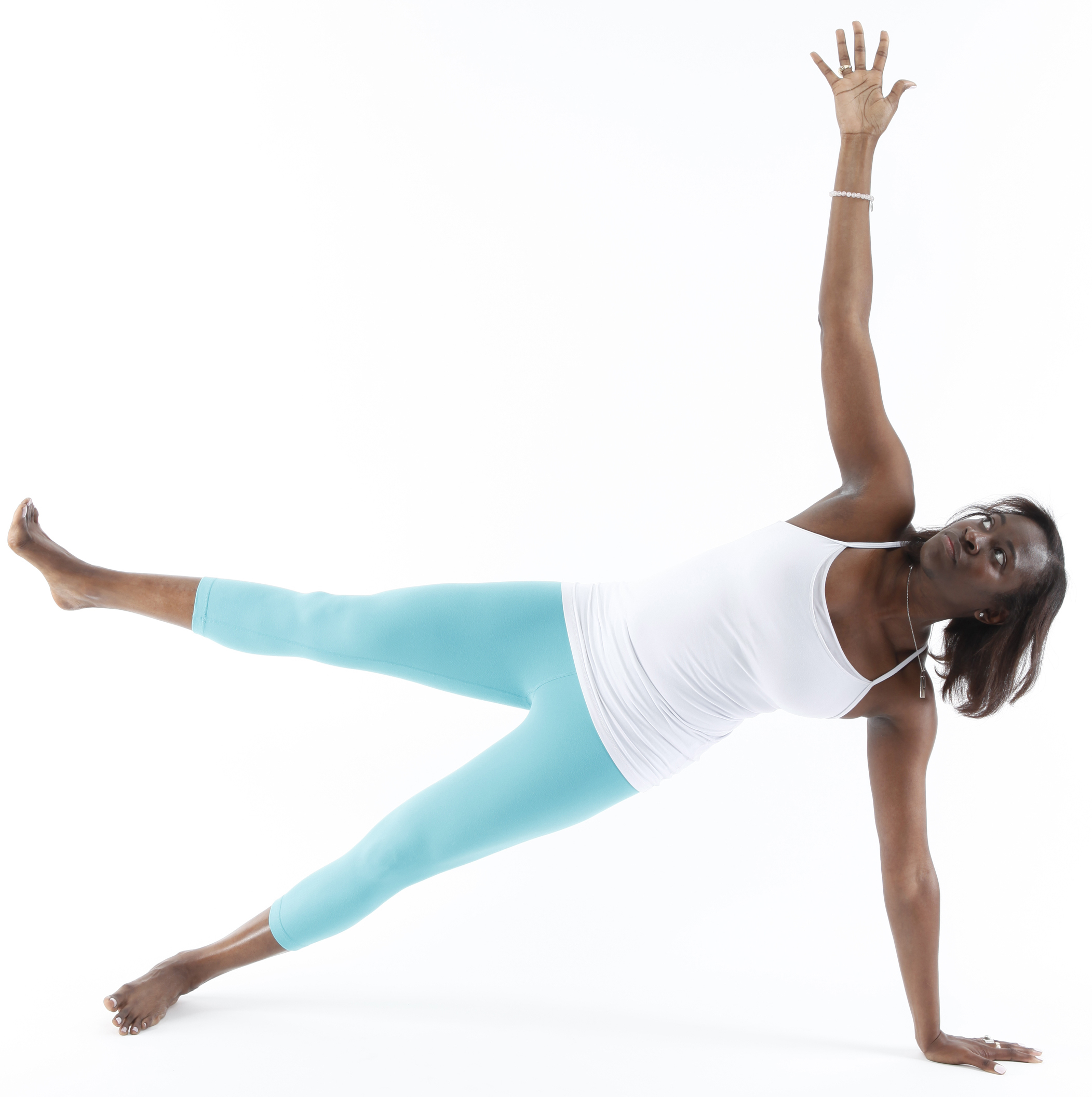
Utthita Vasisthsana

Utthita Vasisthasana (sometimes shortened to Vasisthasana) (Sanskrit: उत्थित वसिष्ठासन, romanized: utthita vasiṣṭhāsana) or Side Plank pose is a balancing asana in modern yoga as exercise.

== Etymology and origins ==
The name of the pose comes from the Sanskrit उत्थित Utthita extended, वसिष्ठ Vasiṣṭha, a sage, and आसन āsana, "posture" or "seat".

The pose is not described in the medieval hatha yoga texts. It appears in the 20th century in the Ashtanga (vinyasa) yoga of Pattabhi Jois.

== Description ==
The pose is a balancing posture with the body, both legs, and both arms straight, the body on one side. The upper arm is raised as high as possible. The upper leg may be rested on the lower leg, or for the full pose (sometimes called Eka Pada Vasisthasana, One-legged Side Plank) may be raised as high as possible; the upper hand may grasp the foot (sometimes called Vasisthasana B), and the gaze may be directed to the upper hand.

== Variations ==
Chamatkarasana (from Sanskrit चमत्कार camatkār, miracle) or Wild Thing Pose keeps most of the body's weight on one foot and the hand on the same side, lifting the other elbow above the head, arm bend, and the other foot behind the knee, so the body faces the side and slightly upwards.

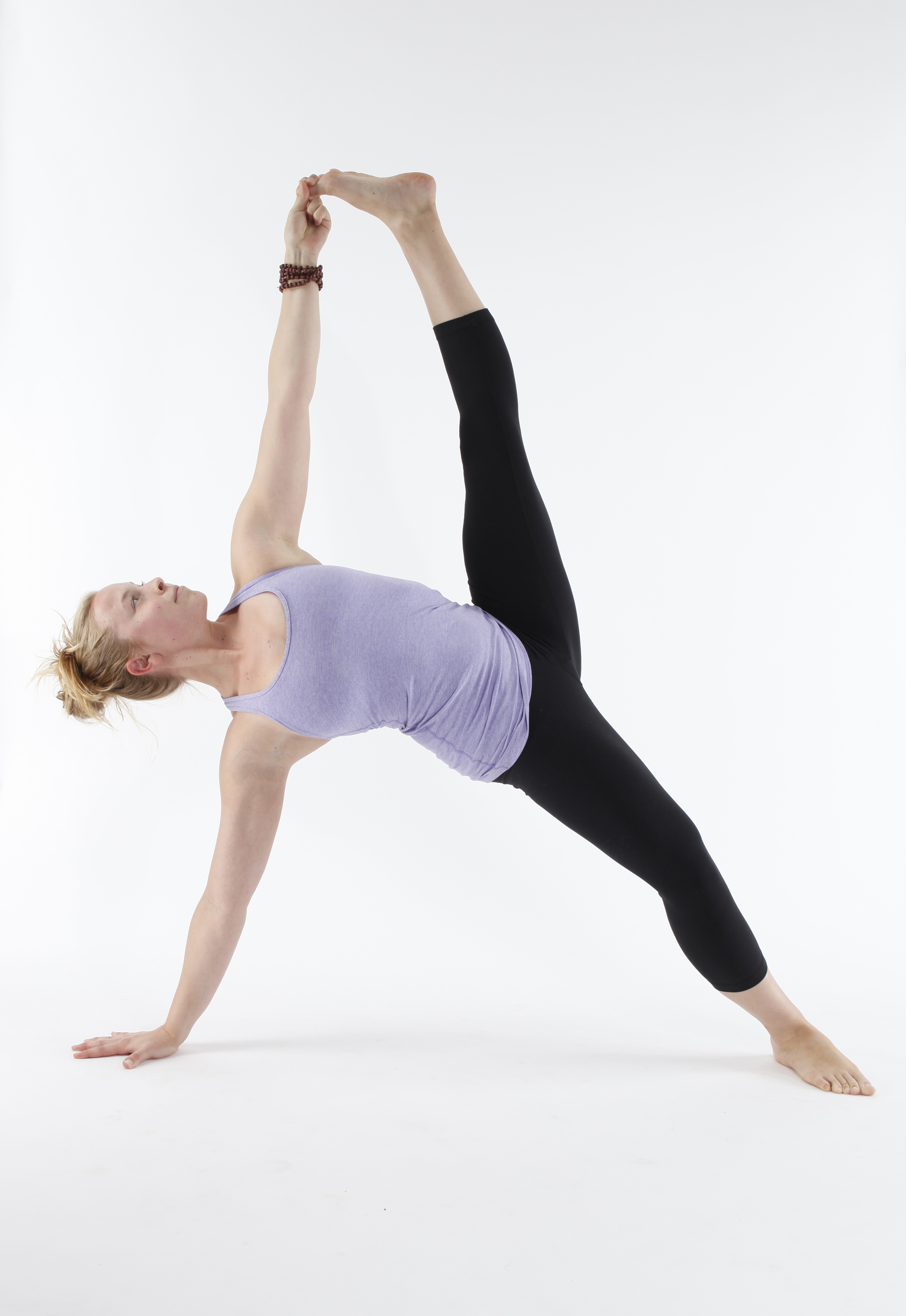
Vasisthasana B, with toe grip

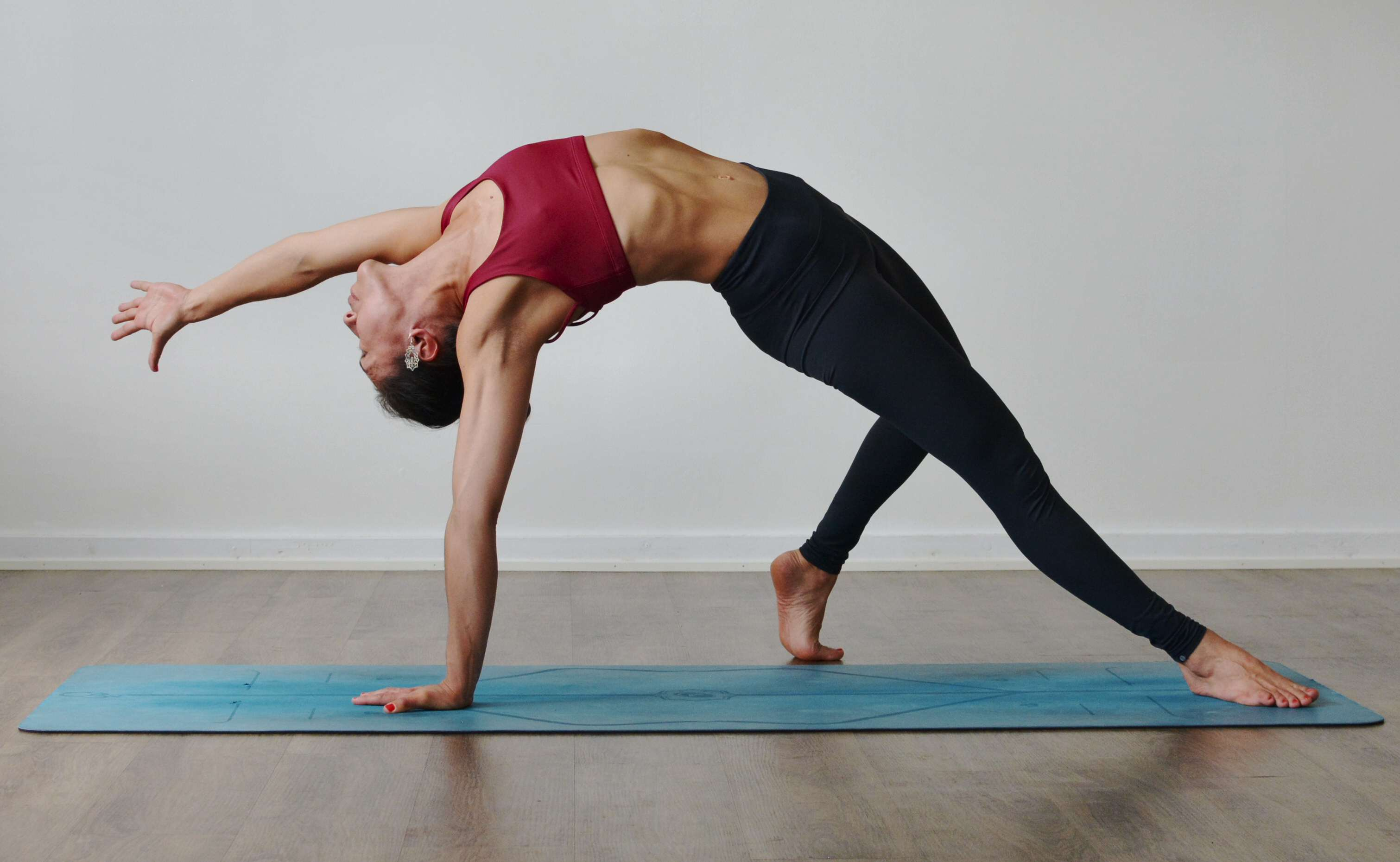
Chamatkarasana, Wild Thing Pose, a modern posture between Vasisthasana and Upward-Facing Bow Pose

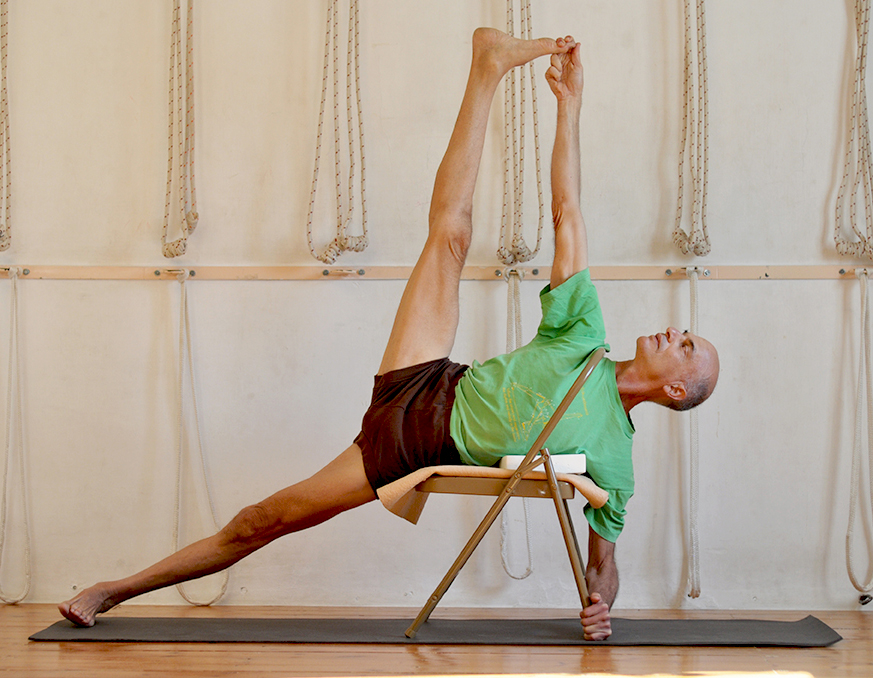
Vasisthasana using props

== See also ==
- Anantasana – a reclining side pose
- Chaturanga Dandasana – low plank pose
- Kala Bhairavasana – like Vasisthasana but with one leg behind the neck
