= Yoga using props =

Use of objects to assist yoga postures

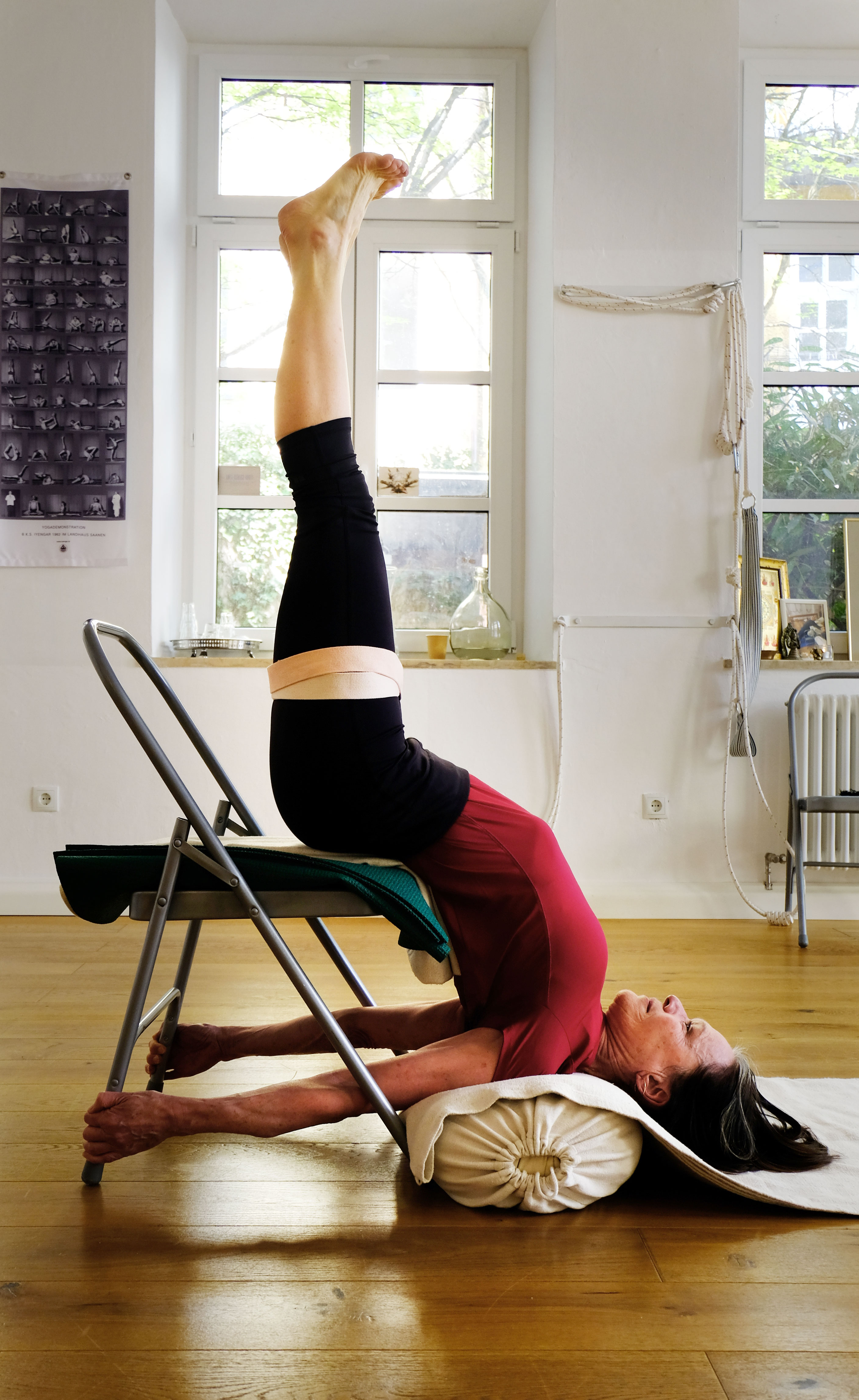
The German yoga teacher Petra Kirchmann demonstrating an inversion using a chair, yoga mat, belt, blanket and bolster in a therapeutic use of yoga

Props used in yoga include chairs, blocks, belts, mats, blankets, bolsters, and straps. They are used in postural yoga to assist with correct alignment in an asana, for ease in mindful yoga practice, to enable poses to be held for longer periods in Yin Yoga, where support may allow muscles to relax, and to enable people with movement restricted for any reason, such as stiffness, injury, or arthritis, to continue with their practice.

One prop, the yoga strap, has an ancient history, being depicted in temple sculptures and described in manuscripts from ancient and medieval times; it was used in Sopasrayasana, also called Yogapattasana, a seated meditation pose with the legs crossed and supported by the strap. In modern times, the use of props is associated especially with the yoga guru B. K. S. Iyengar; his disciplined style required props including belts, blocks, and ropes.

== History ==
=== The yogapaṭṭa in sculpture ===
The practice of yoga as exercise is modern, though some of the asanas are ancient and many more are medieval. A band or strap of cloth was however used in ancient times, some 2000 years ago, to support the body in one asana in particular; this device was the yogapaṭṭa, a term defined in Monier Monier-Williams's Sanskrit-English dictionary. Such a strap is depicted in a relief sculpture on the Great Stupa of Sanchi in Madhya Pradesh, dated c. 50 BCE to 50 CE, in other sculptures from the 7th century CE at Mamallapuram and Ellora, and from the 14th century at Hampi.

In sculpture

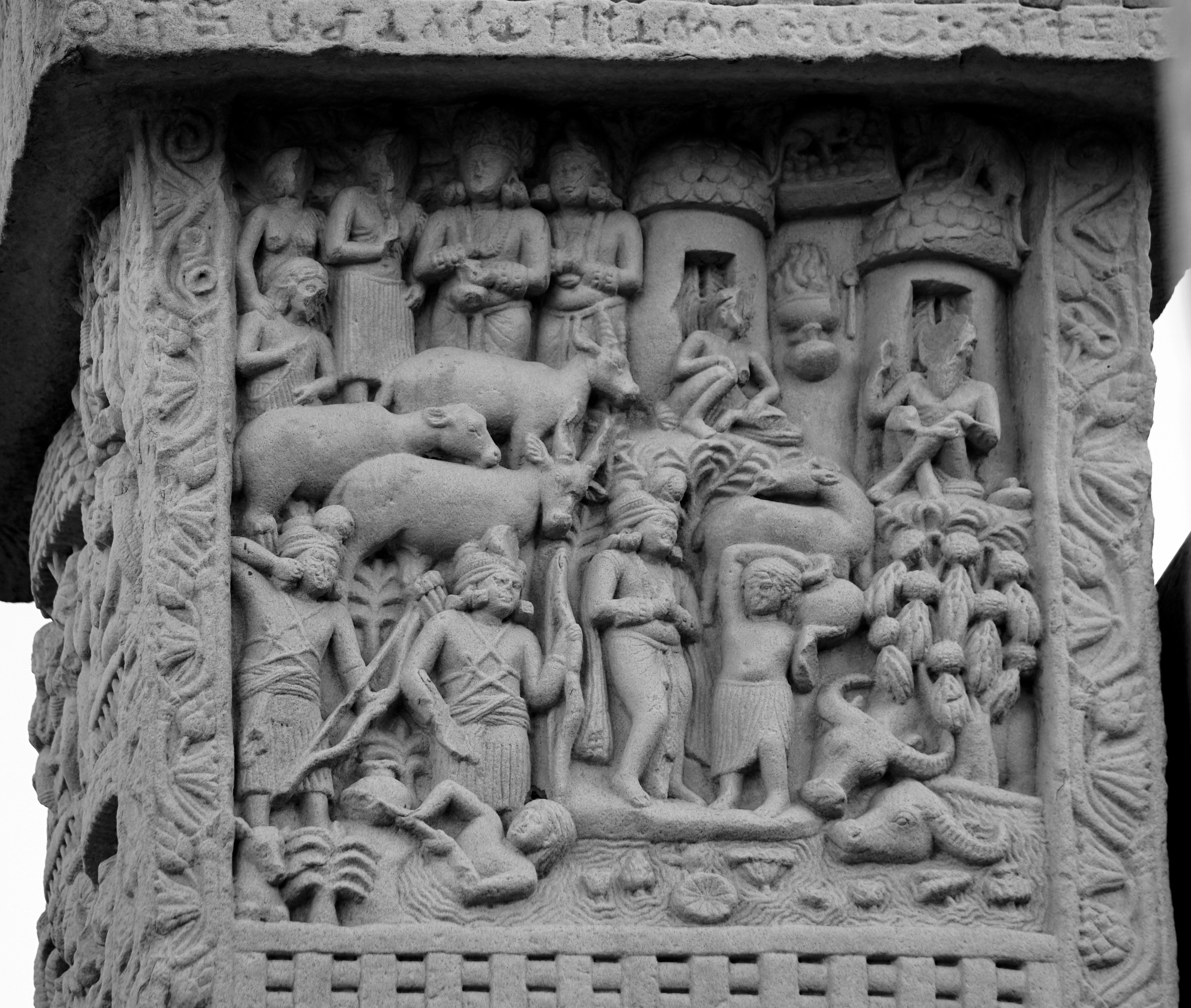
Yogi (top right) using a strap, in relief sculpture of the Syama Jataka, the Great Stupa of Sanchi, c. 50 BCE to 50 CE

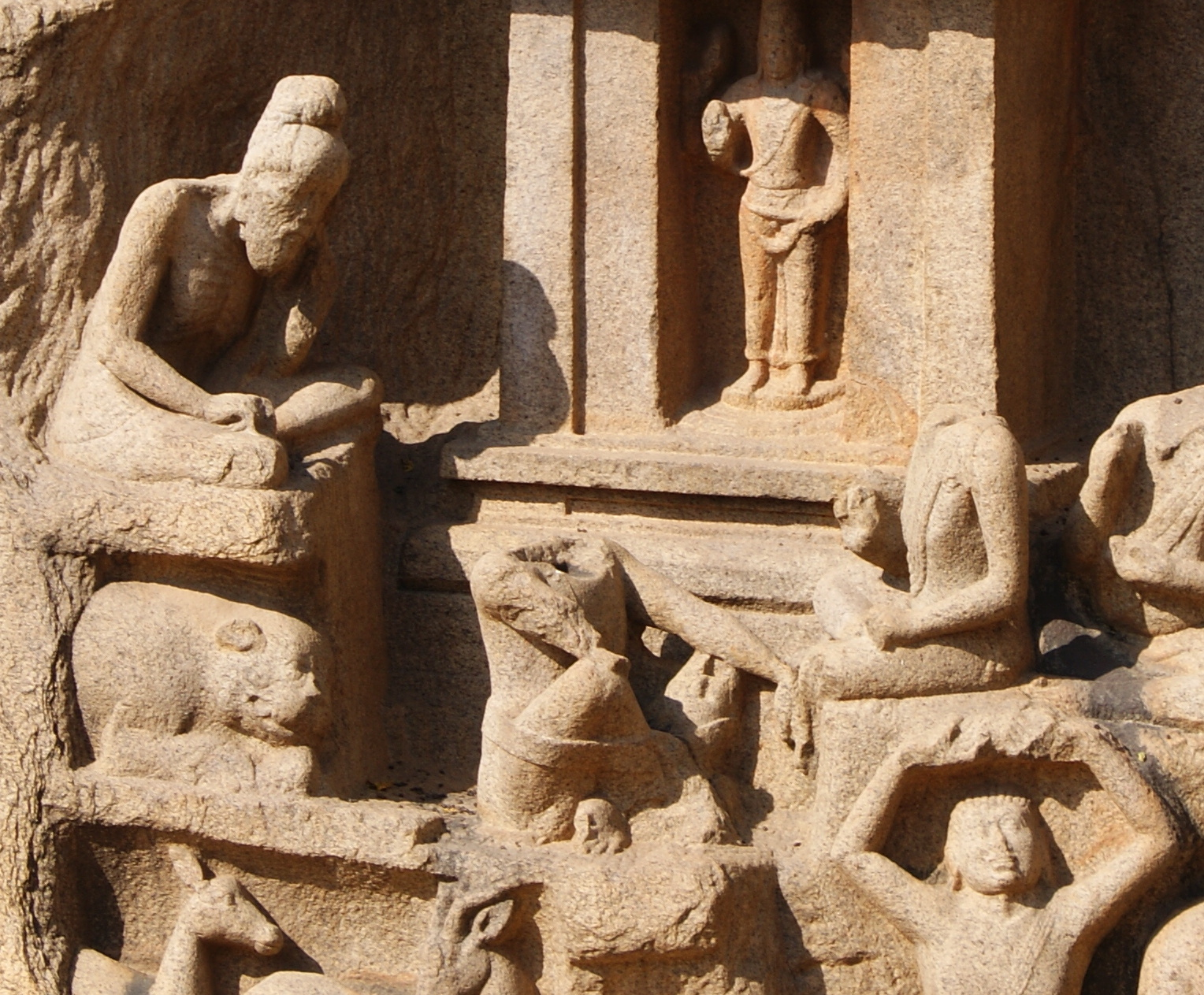
Yogi (centre) using strap around waist and legs, Mahabalipuram Caves, c. 7th century

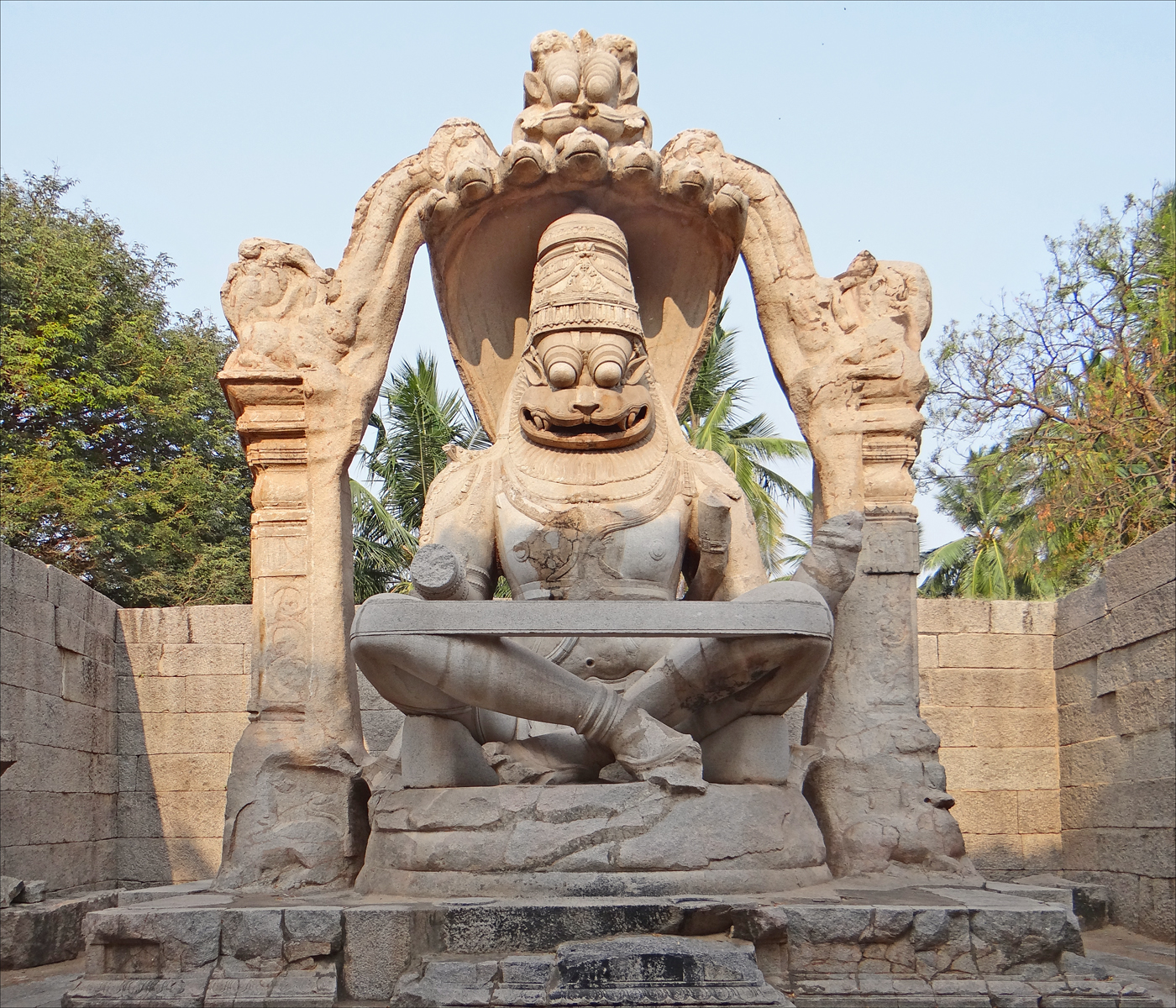
Yoga Narasimha with yogapaṭṭa strap, Hampi, Karnataka, c. 14th century

=== The sopāśraya asana ===
Textual evidence begins with the ancient bhāṣya commentary to the Yoga Sutras of Patanjali, which names an asana called sopāśraya, meaning "with support"; this was interpreted by medieval commentators such as Vācaspati's 10th century Tattvavaiśāradī and Vijñānabhikṣu's 16th century Yogavarttika as meaning the use of a yogapaṭṭa strap. The 19th century Śrītattvanidhi illustrates a seated posture named yogapaṭṭāsana, "the posture with yoga strap", with the band tied around the folded legs. Norman Sjoman states that this seems to have been an alternative meditation pose when the yogi's back needed additional support.

In illustrations

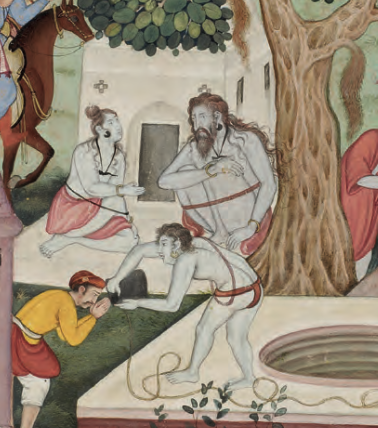
Painting of Nath yogis on Babur's 1519 visit to Gorkhatri. One yogi is using a strap to support his pose. 1590-1593

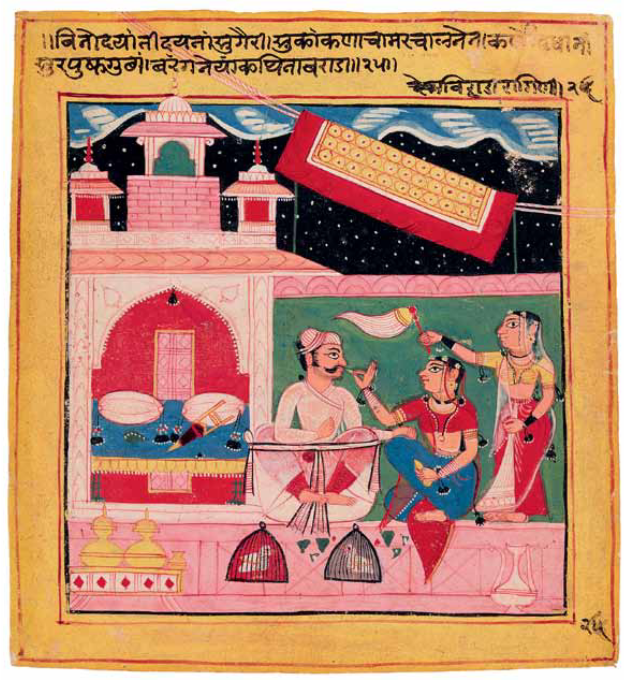
Sitting with a strap. Chawand, Rajasthan, 1605

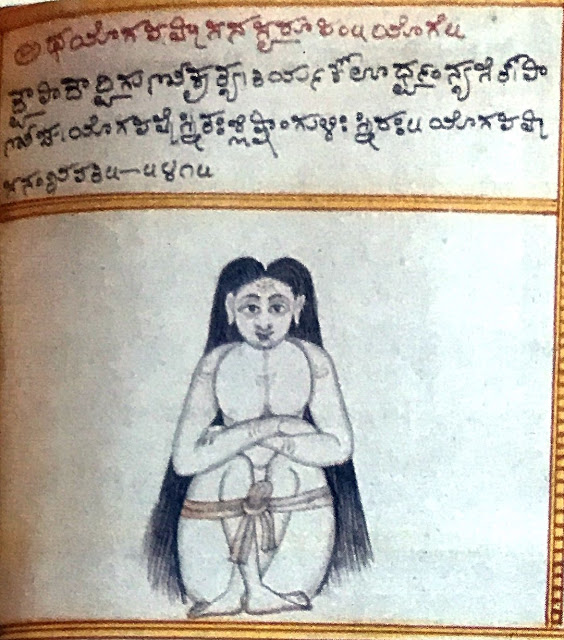
yogapaṭṭāsana, "posture with yoga strap", in Sritattvanidhi, 19th century

=== The stambha meditation crutch ===
In the 8th century Pātañjalayogaśāstravivaraṇa, Shankara glosses the posture mentioned by Patanjali as "The One with Support is with a yoga strap or with a prop such as a crutch"; later commentators such as Vācaspati, Hemacandra and Vijñānabhikṣu speak of the posture only as using a strap. The scholar James Mallinson however comments that a crutch (stambha or adhārī) is seen both in miniature paintings of yogis and in current use (in India). Mallinson states that the meditation crutch was in wide use amongst ascetics from the 16th century onwards; he has travelled India visiting hatha yoga practitioners, and describes the use of the crutch as "rare today, but not unknown", providing a photograph of a yogi at the 2010 Kumbh Mela at Haridwar in evidence.

Stambha meditation crutch in use by a yogi at the Kumbh Mela, Haridwar, in 2010. Detail of photograph by James Mallinson

The 16th century Yogacintāmaṇī mentions sopāśrayāsana "Pose with Support" which uses a yoga belt as above, and describes two postures which use a crutch. One is Āsāvari "Best of the Crutches", which uses an āsā, probably meaning a T-shaped prop. Birch states that the yogi can place the prop under one armpit, or have it in front of the body with both arms resting on it. The other is Nidrāharāsana "Posture to prevent sleep", where a fine balance is maintained with the lower legs crossed in Padmasana and the body upright from the knees (a form of Gorakshasana), and the hands again holding a T-shaped prop.

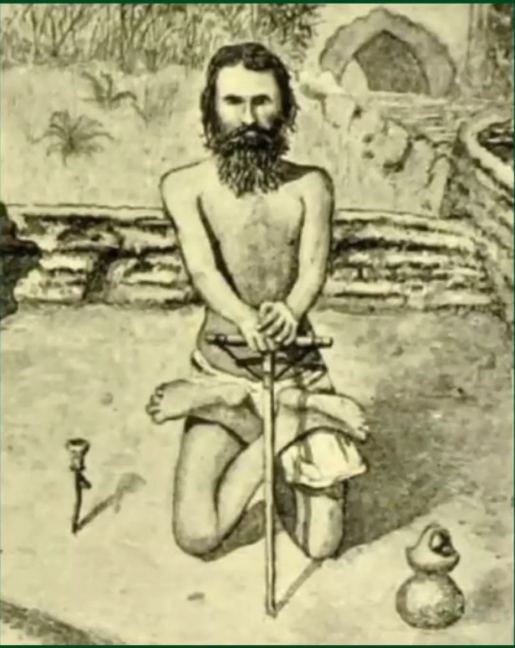
Nidrāharāsana, pose to prevent sleep, in the 19th century Yogāsana, using a T-shaped prop

== Modern practice ==
=== For correct alignment ===
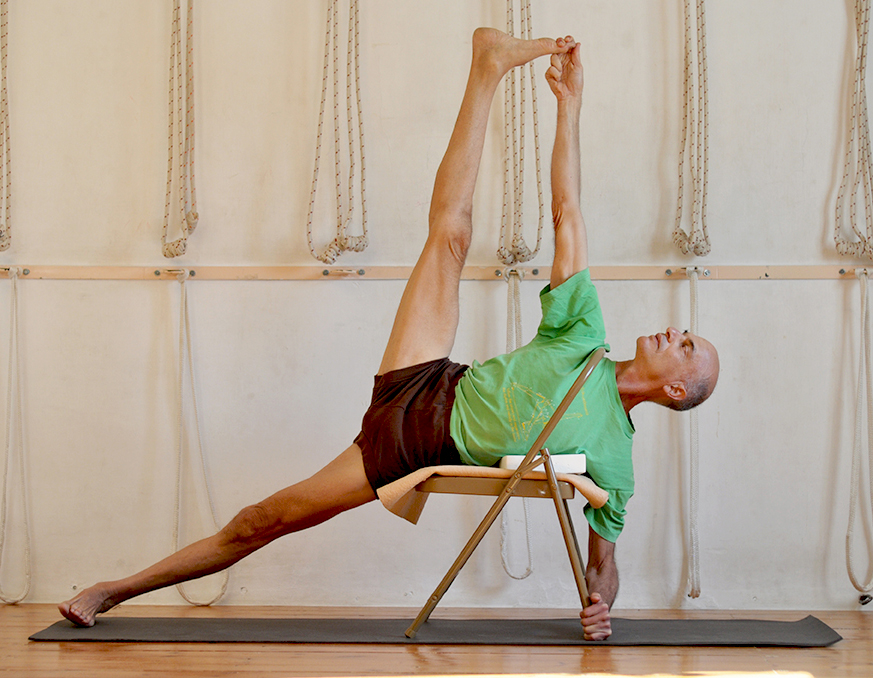
Schools such as Iyengar Yoga use props including blocks, blankets, and chairs to assist correct alignment, as here in Utthita Vasisthasana.

Chairs and other props are used widely in some schools of modern yoga as exercise. The use of props was pioneered in Iyengar Yoga, to enable students to work with correct alignment both as beginners and in more advanced asanas with suitable support. Iyengar Yoga was created by B. K. S. Iyengar, a pupil of the yoga pioneer Tirumalai Krishnamacharya, and described in his authoritative 1966 book Light on Yoga. The scholar of religion Andrea Jain observes that the book "prescribed a thoroughly individualistic system of postural yoga", one that was "rigorous and disciplined", requiring props such as "belts, bricks, and ropes". The props served to guide the practitioner rather than to provide support.

For example, in Iyengar Yoga, Sarvangasana, shoulder stand, can be practised under suitable supervision with the shoulders on a bolster, the buttocks supported on the seat of a chair and a blanket, and the legs resting on the top of the chair's back.

=== For ease in practice ===
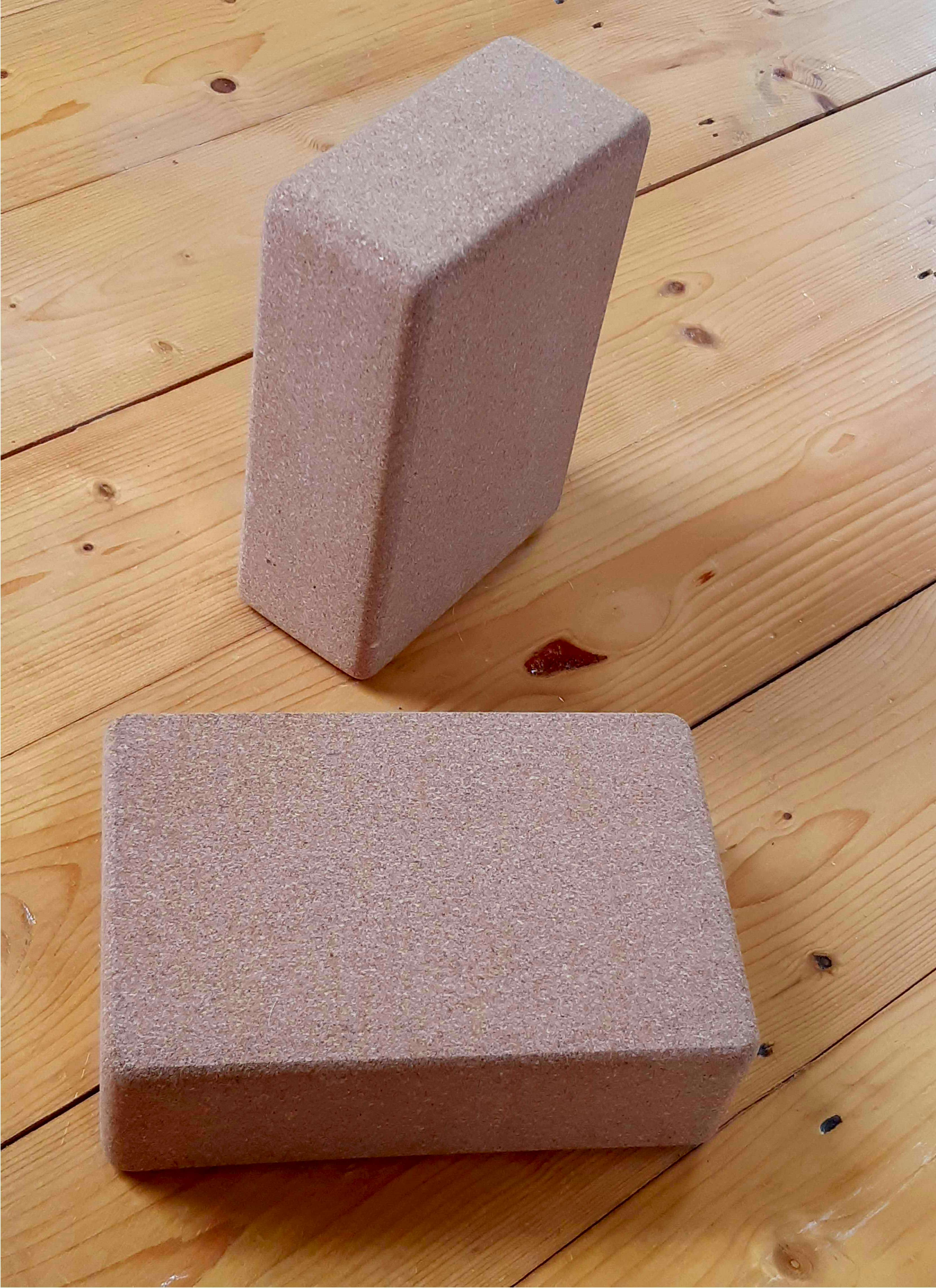
A pair of blocks can support the body, such as under the knees in Butterfly (Baddha Konasana).

The founder of the OM Yoga Center, Cyndi Lee, describes the use of props as part of a practice of Mindful Yoga. She wrote that students accustomed to vinyasa yoga "would rather strain and grunt" trying to touch their toes, endangering their backs, rather than use props such as a yoga belt or block to reduce the strain or elevate the pelvis. The students ignored her, thinking that "ease in their practice ... meant easy and that was wimpy. Not enough challenge, boring, too slow." She found that this gradually changed as the students recognised duhkha, which she defines as the pain that comes from ignoring the reality of a situation. In her view, using yoga props was a form of ahimsa, the yogic practice of nonviolence, in this case avoiding having the will or ego fighting the body.

=== For Yin Yoga ===
The teacher of Yin Yoga Bernie Clark wrote that many yoga students see props as "cheating", perhaps feeling that since they are used in restorative yoga sessions, they are not suitable for other students. Clark counters that props offer multiple benefits, including increasing or decreasing stress in specific areas; creating length and space; making certain positions accessible; providing support and thus enabling muscles to release; and increasing comfort, enabling postures to be held for longer durations. These benefits are especially noticeable in a slower practice such as Yin Yoga. Clark cites the founder of Insight Yoga, Sarah Powers, as writing that "when the bones feel supported, the muscles can relax". He comments that highly experienced practitioners can easily miss out on this benefit, feeling that they have no need for props, but that even they may discover in "Butterfly Pose" (the Yin Yoga version of Baddha Konasana) that supporting the knees on blocks allows muscles they did not know they were engaging to relax, transferring the asana's stress to the fascia. He lists a wide variety of props beyond those most commonly used, and suggests uses for them.

=== To go deeper into a pose ===
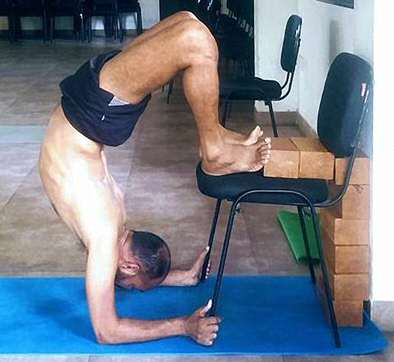
Props can be useful to the advanced student, such as for inverted poses like Vrischikasana (Scorpion), allowing longer holds without fear of falling.

The leading Iyengar yoga teacher Dean Lerner, in Yoga Journal, stated that the benefits of props depend on the experience, maturity, and ability of the practitioner; a mature student can use props to enable "refined penetration into the pose and one's being". Students may be afraid, he notes, of an inverted pose such as Shirshasana (yoga headstand); by practising against a wall, the student can learn to master the fear of falling, and can then continue practising there to develop stability, right alignment, and refined balance. He adds that props can also be used to enable poses to be held for a longer duration, developing stability of mind and body, as well as poise and concentration; these, he states, enable the mind to draw inward and develop objectivity and humility, a step on the journey towards the Self.

=== To prevent slipping ===
The yoga mat has become ubiquitous in the practice of yoga as exercise, to the extent that it may not even be thought of as a prop. Its main function is "stickiness", to prevent slipping, though it also provides a more comfortable surface such as for kneeling poses. The mat may equally mark out a territory in a crowded class, or create a ritual space as it is unrolled to begin a session and rolled up at the end.

=== When movement is restricted ===
A class practising yoga in chairs

Alice Christensen's Easy Does It Yoga, first described in 1979, uses "chair exercises", alongside others on floor or bed, and in later editions also in swimming pools, for older practitioners with restricted movement. Lakshmi Voelker-Binder created an approach named Chair Yoga in 1982, on seeing that one of her pupils, aged only in her thirties, was unable to do floor poses because of arthritis.

Yoga as therapy is the use of asanas as a gentle form of exercise and relaxation, applied specifically with the intention of improving health. This may involve meditation, imagery, breath work (pranayama) and music alongside the exercise. A 2013 systematic review found beneficial effects of yoga on low back pain.

=== For aerial yoga ===
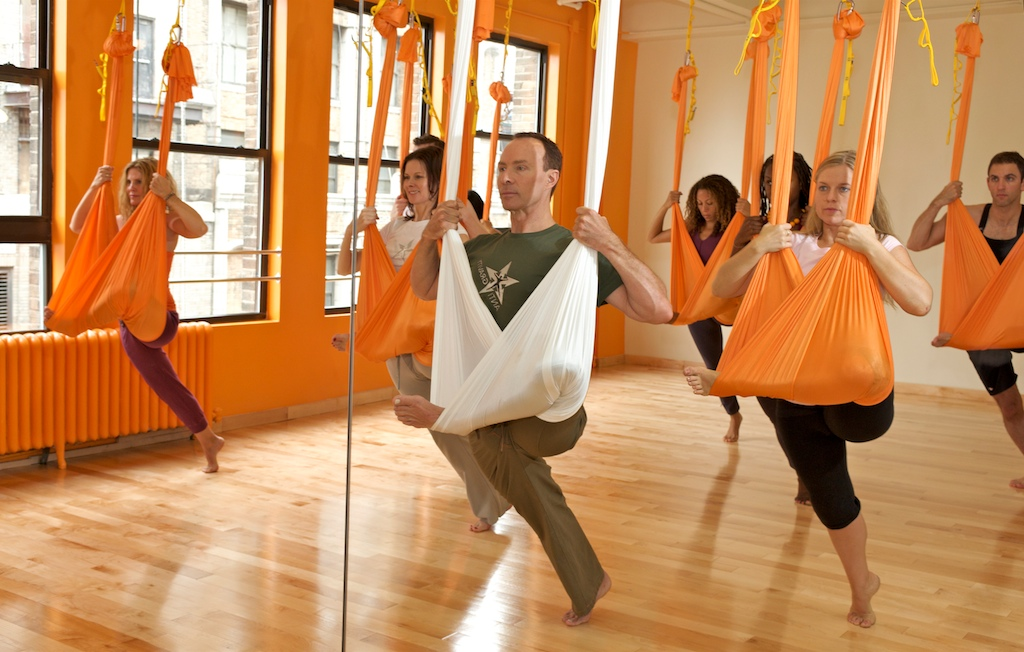
An aerial yoga class practising Flying Pigeon Pose, the aerial variant of Rajakapotasana

Aerial yoga, a yoga hybrid, requires the use of a silk hammock with straps attached by carabiners to support chains, to permit practitioners to perform variants of yoga poses without weight on their hands or feet. Difficult mat-based yoga postures may prove easier to perform through aerial yoga, while the hammock's movement adds variety to the aerial workout.

== See also ==
- List of yoga schools
- Yoga pants
