= Yoga in the United States =

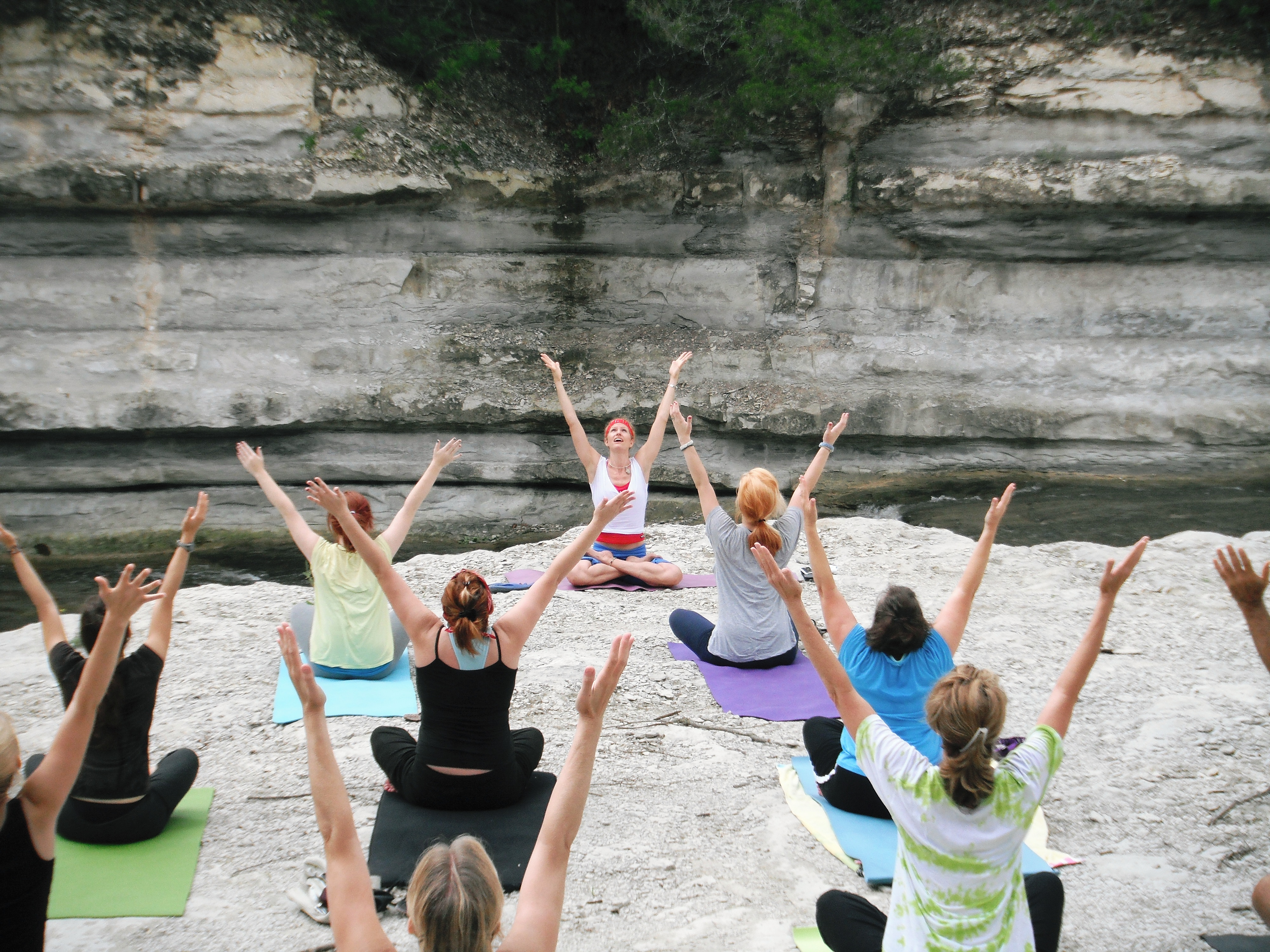
A community outdoor yoga class in Dallas–Fort Worth, Texas, 2010

The history of yoga in the United States begins in the 19th century, with the philosophers Ralph Waldo Emerson and Henry David Thoreau; Emerson's poem "Brahma" states the Hindu philosophy behind yoga. More widespread interest in yoga can be dated to the Hindu leader Vivekananda's visit from India in 1893; he presented yoga as a spiritual path without postures (asanas), very different from modern yoga as exercise. Two other early figures, however, the women's rights advocate Ida C. Craddock and the businessman and occultist Pierre Bernard, created their own interpretations of yoga, based on tantra and oriented to physical pleasure.

The practice of yoga as consisting mainly of physical postures began in 1919 when the pioneer of asana-based yoga, Yogendra, brought his system, influenced by physical culture, to the United States. From 1948, Indra Devi, a pupil of Krishnamacharya, brought yoga to public attention by teaching celebrity pupils in her Hollywood studio. A large variety of asana systems evolved, including the precise Iyengar Yoga and Pattabhi Jois's energetic Ashtanga (vinyasa) yoga and its Power Yoga spinoffs. Spiritual styles also flourished, including Transcendental Meditation and Integral Yoga. Despite this, American yoga has largely detached from its religious roots, becoming part of the cosmopolitan "global popular".

== Early pioneers ==
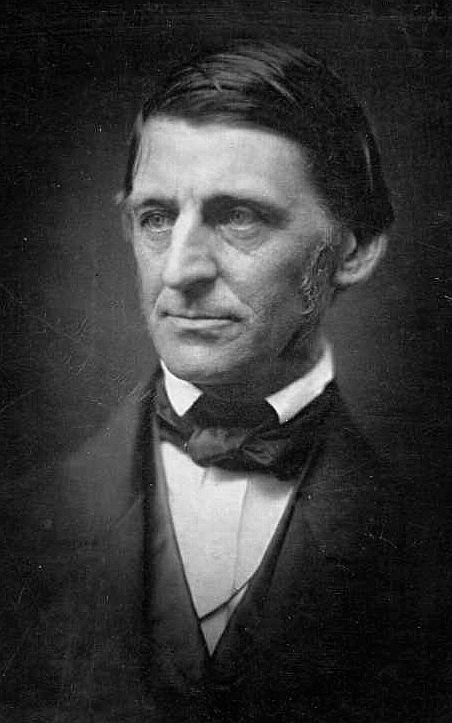
Ralph Waldo Emerson was influenced by the Bhagavad Gita.

Long before yoga arrived in the United States, pioneering thinkers began to assimilate Indian thought. Among the first was the poet and philosopher Ralph Waldo Emerson. In 1857 he published a poem, "Brahma", in the first issue of literary magazine The Atlantic Monthly, which he had helped to found. The work contained the lines "I am the doubter and the doubt, I am the hymn the Brahmin sings." Emerson was expressing the Hindu philosophy of non-duality, Advaita. He had studied among other Hindu scriptures the Bhagavad Gita, in which Krishna instructs Arjuna in yoga. Emerson was mercilessly mocked, and 26 parodies of the poem were published within a month of its appearance; Americans were starting to engage with Hindu philosophy.

Henry David Thoreau, too, read translations of Hindu texts, quoting frequently from the Bhagavad Gita, and attempted meditation during his ascetic life – itself an indication of how strongly he was influenced by those texts – in the forest at Walden. Stefanie Syman argues that he deserved the title of Yogi.

Another pioneer was Madame Blavatsky, co-founder in 1875 of The Theosophical Society in New York, her philosophy blending several Asian traditions. She repeatedly over the course of six years stressed the importance of Patanjali's system of yoga, before travelling to India and Ceylon and astonishing the American public by suddenly converting to Buddhism, a tradition that Syman notes was even more deeply despised in the 19th century United States than Hinduism.

== Arrival ==
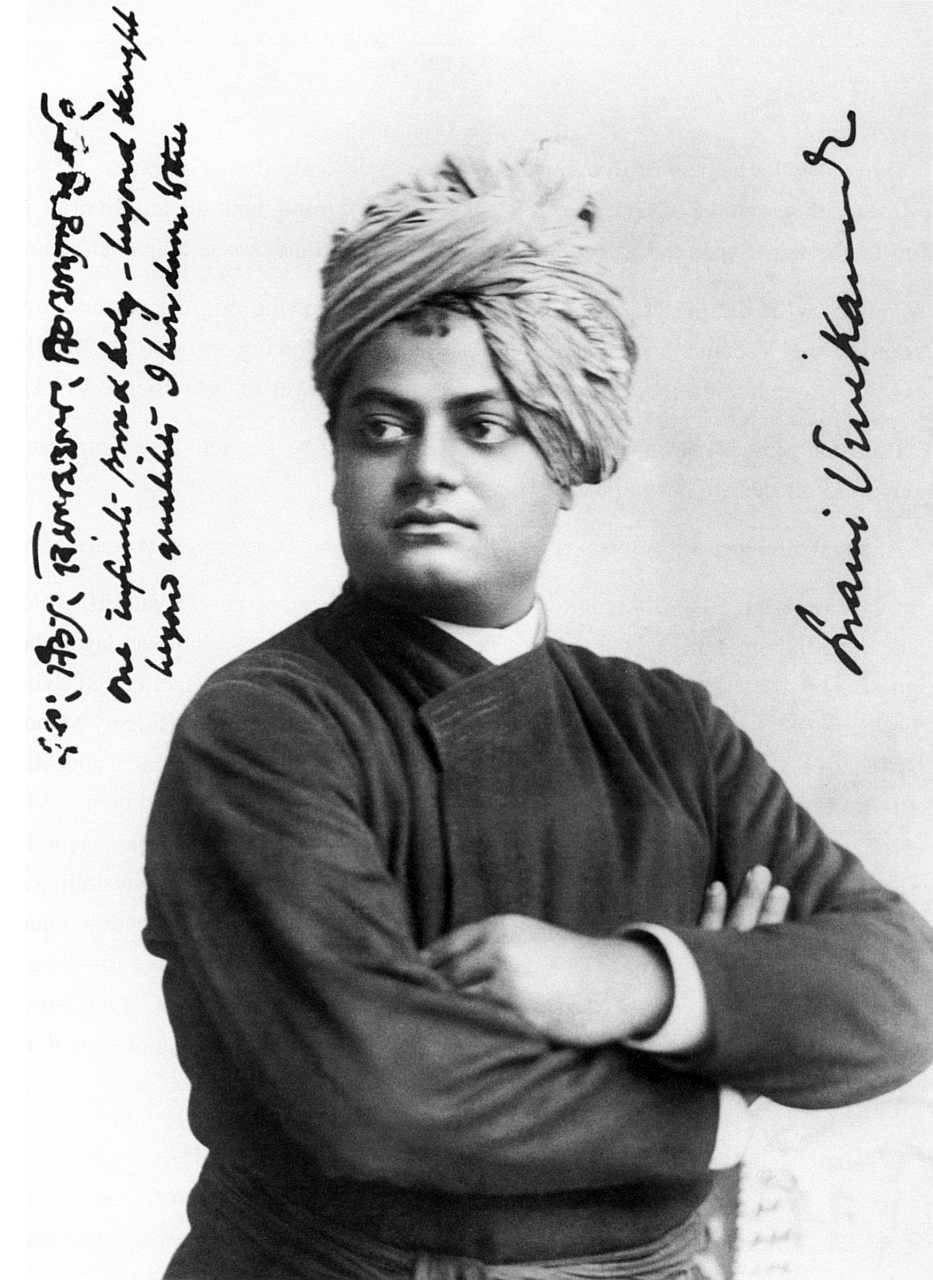
Swami Vivekananda brought yoga to the United States in 1893, but rejected the practice of asanas.

In 1893, Swami Vivekananda gave several lectures at the Chicago World Parliament of Religions. The event effectively marked the start of yoga in the United States, and the birth of modern yoga as a transnational movement. It was followed in 1896 by his popular book, Raja Yoga. He taught a mixture of yoga breathwork (pranayama), meditation, and the distinctively Western idea of positive thinking, derived from the New Thought movement. Like other high-caste Hindus and British colonial officers in India at the time, he explicitly rejected the practice of asanas and hatha yoga.

Ida C. Craddock became interested in yoga and tantra late in the 19th century, a time when Americans were questioning Christian orthodoxy while others were struggling to uphold it. As a woman, and the creator of a system of techniques to enhance sexual pleasure, she came under attack. Among her sources was the Shiva Samhita and in particular its account of Vajroli mudra, involving delayed ejaculation and the practiced uptake of sexual fluids through the penis. She further enraged religious fundamentalists by asserting that God was a third partner in a sacralized sexual union, and in 1899 by creating a Church of Yoga. She was convicted and imprisoned in New York in 1902 for obscenity and blasphemy. The yoga scholar Andrea Jain comments that this marked the start of a split between a modern, physical yoga that celebrated the body, and a more traditional meditative practice that, like Vivekananda's yoga, essentially shunned it.

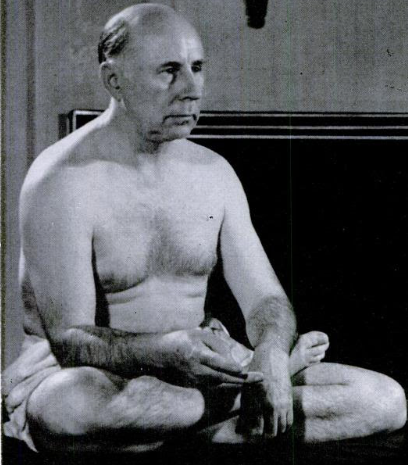
Pierre Bernard in lotus position, 1939. He brought attention to yoga but caused the public to associate it with trickery and magic.

Another controversial figure, Pierre Bernard, brought yoga to the notice of a suspicious American public, but despite persecution managed to attract a modest following of eccentrics, including his nephew Theos Bernard. He learnt yoga from a tantric yogi, Sylvais Hamati, a man of mixed descent who had managed to reach Lincoln, Nebraska, apparently from Calcutta. Hamati taught Bernard a combination of asanas including lotus position and headstand, purifications (shatkarmas) including dhauti, and breath control (pranayama). In a celebrated exploit, Bernard used his skill in pranayama to simulate death (Kali mudra): a physician, in front of a crowd of witnesses, was unable to feel his pulse. Bernard and Hamati created a Tantrik Order, shrouded in an exciting degree of secrecy, with seven levels of initiation involving mantras, asanas, pranayama, and doctrine. Offended onlookers described it as "lust, mummery, and black magic". Eventually in 1918 Bernard moved to Nyack, New York, creating an "esoteric country club for 'Tantriks'" supported by wealthy backers including some of the Vanderbilts. Club members learnt hatha yoga, which Bernard assured them would increase their enjoyment of life's pleasures, and were treated to "opulent circuses" and other entertainments.

== Yoga as asanas ==
=== Between the wars ===
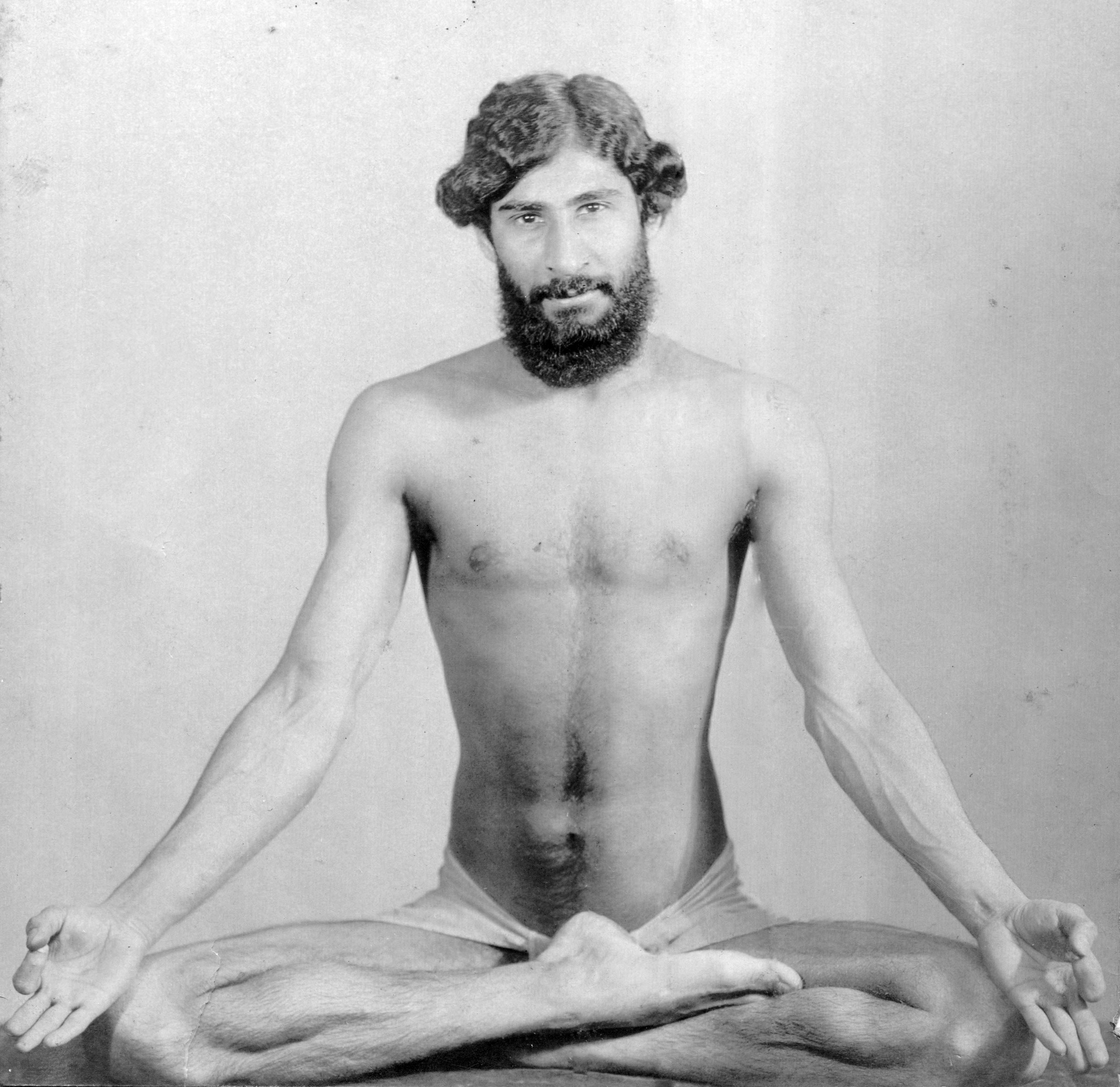
Yogendra, here in Siddhasana, brought the practice of asanas to the United States in 1919.

Yoga asanas were brought to the United States in 1919 by Yogendra, sometimes called "the Father of the Modern Yoga Renaissance", his system influenced by the physical culture of Max Müller; his Yoga Institute of America in Harriman, New York, operated for a few years. The following year, the Hindu spiritual leader Paramahansa Yogananda spoke about Kriya Yoga in Boston, and in 1925 he founded the Self-Realization Fellowship in Los Angeles, where he taught yoga, including asanas, breathing, chanting and meditation, to tens of thousands of Americans, as described in his classic 1946 book Autobiography of a Yogi.

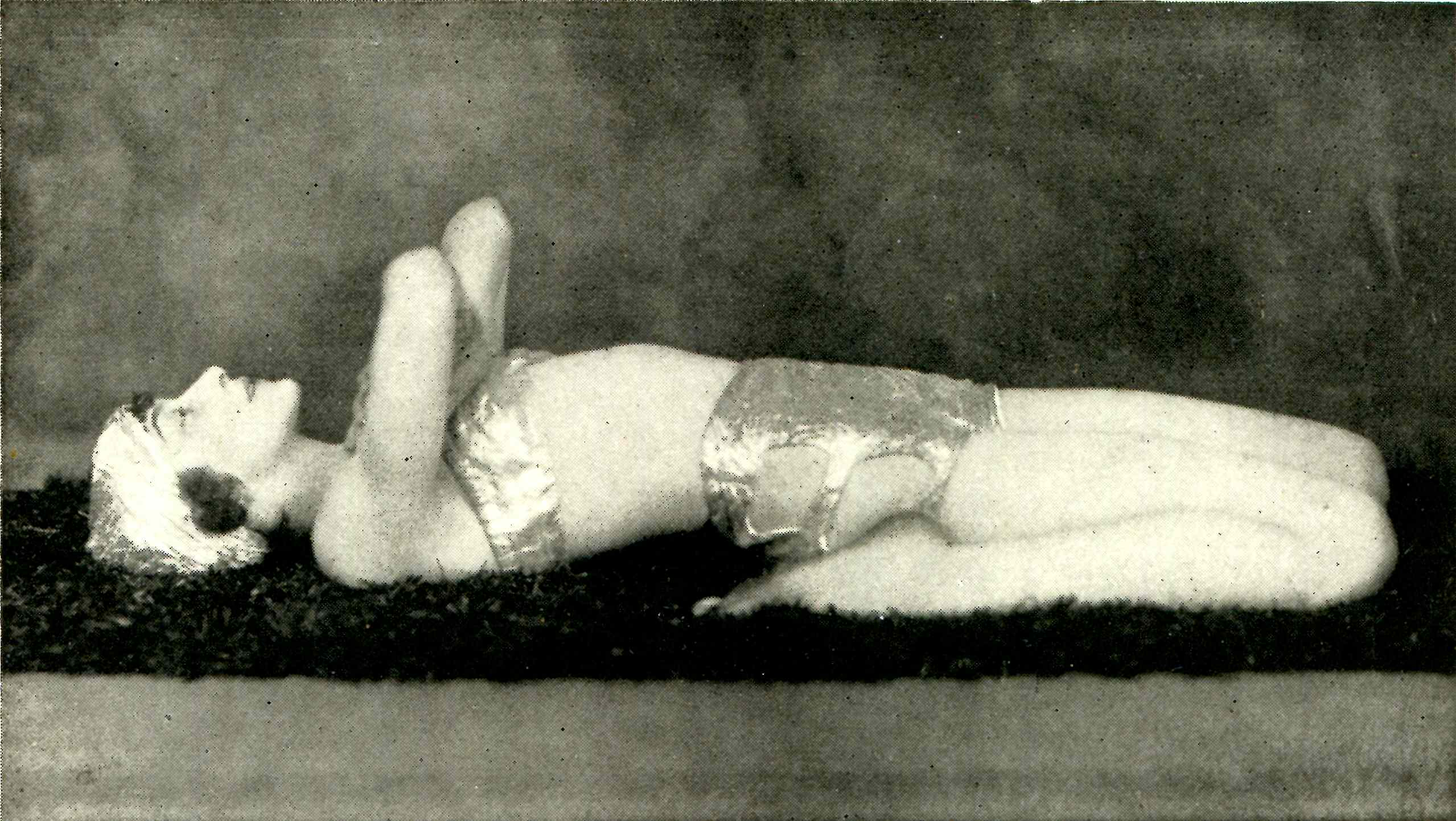
Marguerite Agniel in Supta Virasana, wearing a silver-colored bikini with matching turban. Studio photograph by John de Mirjian, c. 1928

Yoga and meditation appear in Marguerite Agniel's 1931 book The Art of the Body: Rhythmic Exercise for Health and Beauty, illustrated with studio photographs by John de Mirjian of Agniel sitting with eyes closed for meditation in Siddhasana, reclining in Supta Virasana, and inverted in Halasana, in each case dressed in a shining silver bikini with matching turban. Agniel wrote a piece for The Nudist in 1938 showing nude women practicing yoga, accompanied by a text on attention to the breath. The social historian Sarah Schrank comments that it made perfect sense to combine nudism and yoga, as "both were exercises in healthful living; both were countercultural and bohemian; both highlighted the body; and both were sensual without being explicitly erotic."

Theos Bernard's 1943 Hatha Yoga: The Report of a Personal Experience presented hatha yoga as a complex, difficult practice requiring serious commitment, and was the first to include a set of high-quality photographs of some 30 asanas. He was Pierre Bernard's nephew, and contrary to his implication that he had learnt hatha yoga from a guru in India, his teacher was in all probability his father.

=== After the Second World War ===
In 1948, Indra Devi, a pupil of the modern yoga pioneer Tirumalai Krishnamacharya, opened her Hollywood yoga studio, teaching asanas to celebrities such as the actress Gloria Swanson. The effect was to make yoga glamorous and acceptable, especially to women. The Indian yoga guru and peace activist Swami Vishnudevananda came to San Francisco in 1958, going on to found the Sivananda Yoga Vedanta Centres worldwide, with its headquarters in Montreal, Canada. His The Complete Illustrated Book of Yoga (1960) was the first major illustrated guide, showing and describing some 90 yoga asanas and numerous variations in 146 monochrome plates, many of them full-page.

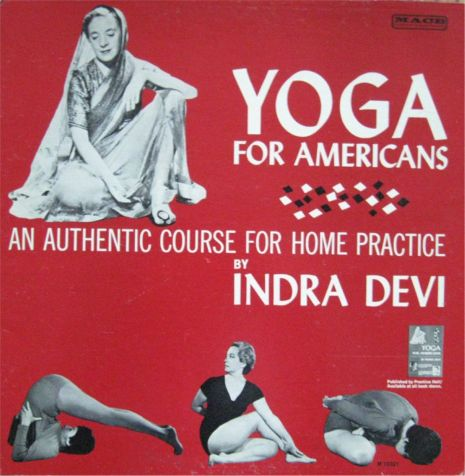
Indra Devi's 1959 Yoga for Americans encouraged women to practice at home. On the cover (top left), she wears her characteristic sari.

Richard Hittleman launched his yoga television show, Yoga for Health, in 1961, enabling him to sell millions of copies of his books on yoga. He carefully minimized yoga's esoteric aspects such as kundalini and the subtle body, though personally he believed the goal of yoga was indeed "pure bliss consciousness". Both the show and the books presented yoga to a wide audience across the United States. Other yoga television shows followed, including Lilias Folan's WCET series Lilias, Yoga and You!, which ran from the 1970s to the 1990s, helping to make yoga acceptable to the public throughout the country.

In 1966, another of Krishnamacharya's pupils, his brother-in-law B.K.S. Iyengar, published his influential Light on Yoga, with unprecedentedly precise descriptions and illustrations of some 200 asanas in 600 monochrome photographs. His student Mary Dunn helped to set up the Iyengar Yoga Institute in San Francisco in 1978, and then the Iyengar Yoga Association of New York. Also in 1966, Amrit Desai began to teach yoga in Pennsylvania. He named his organization the Kripalu Yoga Fellowship in 1974; it opened its current centre in Massachusetts in 1983, from where it teaches its own form of yoga, combining asanas, pranayama, and meditation.

Yet another of Krishnamacharya's pupils, K. Pattabhi Jois, came to the United States in 1975, starting a long-lasting craze in the country for Ashtanga Vinyasa Yoga. A vinyasa is a movement that connects yoga poses together; the result is a continuously flowing sequence that can be learnt and practiced as a whole, making yoga into an energetic aerobic exercise. Ashtanga Yoga gave rise to various spinoff styles including Power Yoga in the 1990s, with one form created in 1995 by Beryl Bender Birch and others by Bryan Kest, a student of K. Pattabhi Jois, and Baron Baptiste, trained in the hot style of Bikram Yoga. Bikram Choudhury arrived in the United States in 1971, and by 1974 had created his own style of yoga, with the studios heated to 105 °F (41 °C). He was strongly charismatic, had been taught yoga by the bodybuilder B. C. Ghosh, Yogananda's youngest brother, and like Jois saw hatha yoga as a religion. The two men made yoga serious, hard work, with an intensity that demanded a lifestyle arranged around yoga; up to that point, it had been seen as a slow, gentle, feminine form of exercise, and classes had consisted mainly of women. Practice was so hot and sweaty, and required such mobility, that clothing was reduced to a new minimum: men often wore nothing but long shorts, while women wore footless leggings, sports bras, and small tank tops.

== Yoga as spiritual practice ==
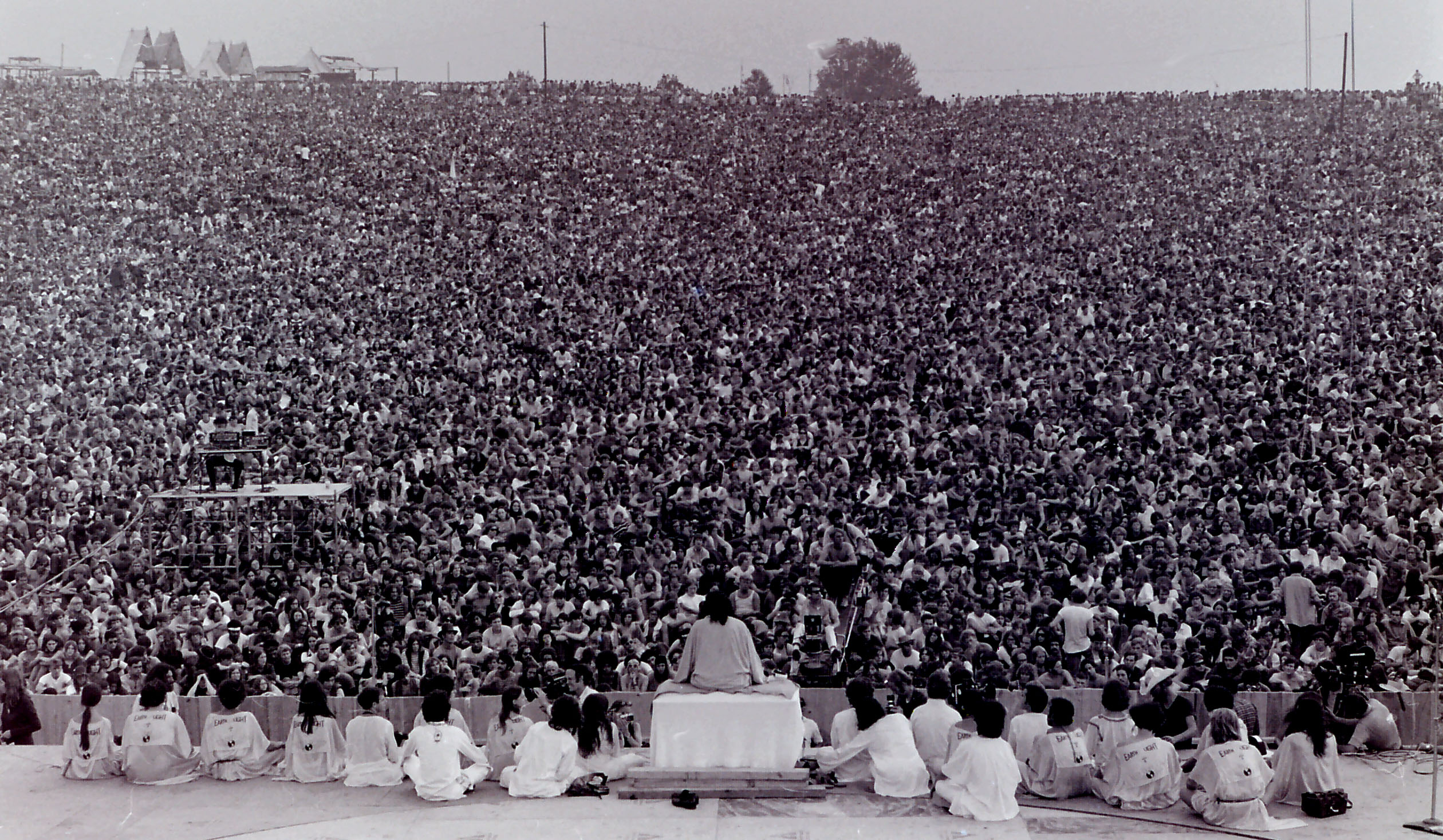
Swami Satchidananda opening the Woodstock Festival in 1969

From 1918, Pierre Bernard and his wife Blanche DeVries ran yoga studios for women, offering a combination of spiritual practices including tantra, traditional Indian medicine, and Vedic philosophy. They influenced American perception of yoga for the next century, combining athleticism, the exotic, sexuality, and a willingness to separate religious practices from their source religions.

American yoga again took a turn towards the spiritual in the 1960s. Maharishi Mahesh Yogi spread his Transcendental Meditation across the United States in the 1960s, and then worldwide. The Indian spiritual master Swami Satchidananda came to the United States in 1966, founding the Integral Yoga institute in Virginia, and in 1969 opening the Woodstock festival. A Harvard professor, Richard Alpert, travelled to India as a pilgrim. He came back to the United States as a guru named Ram Dass, and in 1970 toured its university campuses, encouraging a lifestyle of spiritual search, supported by his book Be Here Now.

In 1975, the yoga teacher Judith Lasater and others founded Yoga Journal; from small beginnings it became American yoga's journal of record. In the 1970s and 1980s, however, yoga was seen by Americans largely as just another form of exercise, alongside aerobics and jogging, and it was practiced by a small minority. Its image changed when in 1989 the yoga teachers Sharon Gannon and David Life opened a New York studio for their explicitly spiritual Jivamukti Yoga. Asanas were practiced in front of images of deities, accompanied by music. By 2009, Lisa Miller could write in Newsweek "We [Americans] are all Hindus now". She quoted the scholar of religion Stephen Prothero's description of America's "divine-deli-cafeteria religion", where people feel free to pick and mix yoga, Catholicism, and Buddhist retreats, if the combination works for them. The historian Catherine Albanese argues that American metaphysicals have constructed a "new and American yogic product" in which the body itself is a vessel for the spirit. The journalist Stefanie Syman notes that effortful yoga has a Protestant streak, as it is both "an indulgence and a penance."

== Cosmopolitan yoga ==
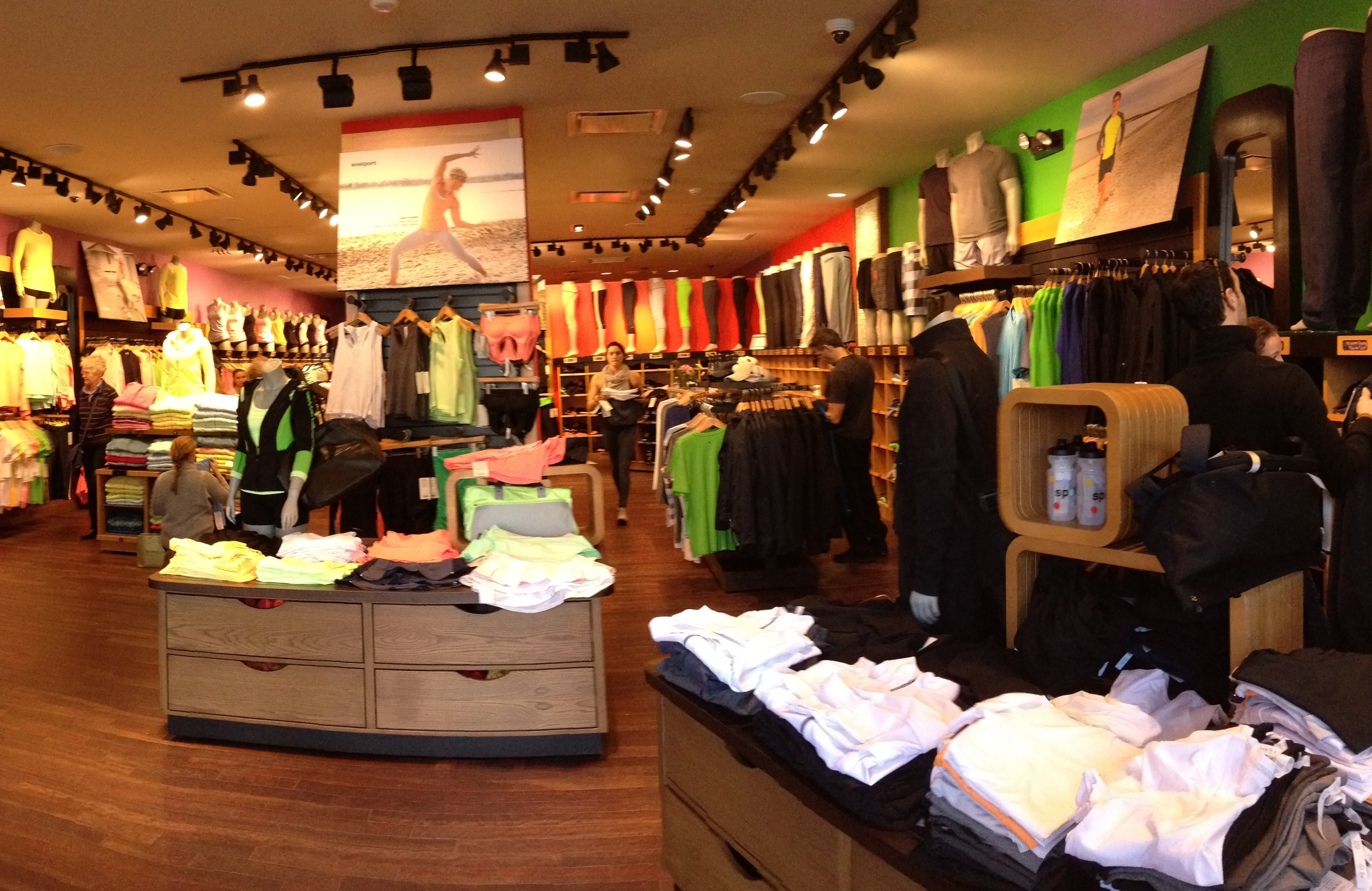
Yoga commercialized: a store in Connecticut, 2013, with yoga clothing and poster

By 2016, according to an Ipsos study, 36.7 million Americans were practicing yoga, making the business of classes, clothing such as yoga pants, and equipment including yoga mats worth $16 billion, compared to $10 billion in 2012. Some 72 percent of practitioners were women.

The historian Jared Farmer noted that if the yoga-practicing population were a religious group, they would easily exceed the number of American Hindus, Muslims, atheists, Mormons, and Jews put together. Farmer identifies 12 general trends in yoga's history in the United States from the 1890s to the 21st century:

peripheral to central; local to global; male to (predominantly) female; spiritual to (mostly) secular; sectarian to universal; mendicant to consumerist; meditational to postural; intellectual to experiential; esoteric to accessible; oral to hands-on teaching; textual to photographic representations of poses; contorted social pariahs to lithe social winners.

Considering all these trends, Farmer stated that modern yoga as exercise belonged to Srinivas Aravamudan's category of the "global popular", which Farmer glossed as "a postcolonial realm of religious cosmopolitanism."

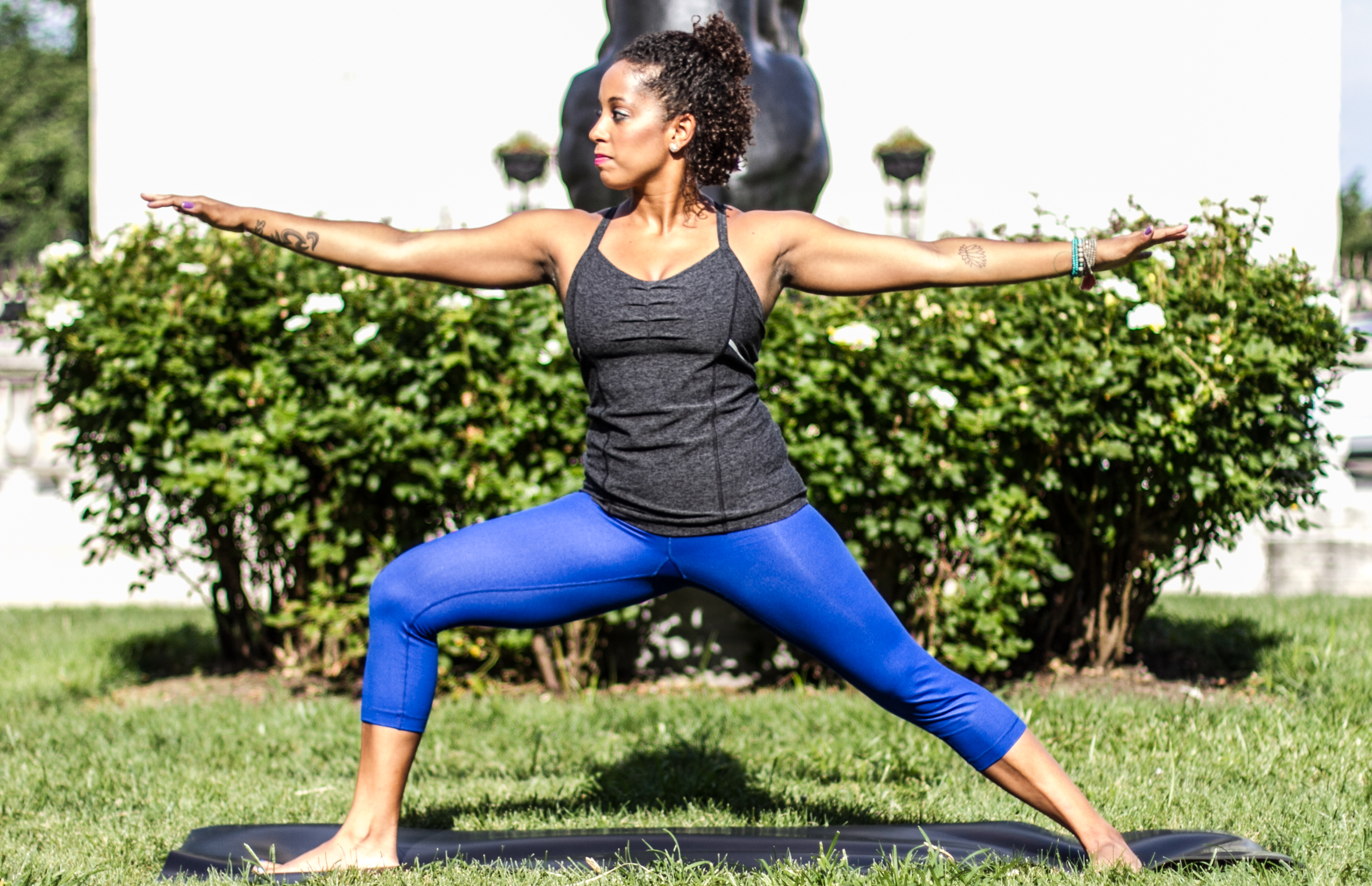
Few yoga practitioners are from minority ethnic groups.

In Lasater's view, American yoga in the 21st century has lost "the gentleness, consistency, and direction of the practice", replaced by ambition. Lasater believes that many Americans "have conflated asana with yoga." Schrank, reviewing the literature in 2014, noted that the journalist William Broad's The Science of Yoga, "lambasted mercilessly by the American yoga community", however took yoga seriously as therapy for mind, body, and spirit. Schrank describes the situation of yoga in the United States as "a complicated dynamic between transnational history, cultural appropriation, and therapeutic science". Schrank notes that none of the books she reviewed addressed the feminist, class, or racial aspects of American yoga, even though most practitioners are women and few are from minority ethnic groups.

== See also ==
- Yoga in Britain
- Yoga in Germany
- Yoga in Italy
- Yoga in Russia
- Yoga in Sweden

== Sources ==
- Agniel, Marguerite (1931). The Art of the Body : Rhythmic Exercise for Health and Beauty. London: B. T. Batsford. OCLC 1069247718.
- Albanese, Catherine (2007). A Republic of Mind and Spirit: A Cultural History of American Metaphysical Religion. Yale University Press. ISBN 978-0-300-13615-9. OCLC 191732654.
- Ashtanga (2011). "Ashtanga Yoga Background". Ashtanga Yoga. Archived from the original on 25 July 2011.
- Birch, Beryl Bender (1995). Power Yoga: The total strength and flexibility workout. Simon and Schuster. p. 291. ISBN 978-0-02-058351-6.
- Devi, Indra (1953). Forever Young, Forever Healthy:Simplified Yoga for Modern Living. Prentice Hall. OCLC 652377847.
- Farmer, Jared (2012). "Americanasana". Reviews in American History. 40 (1): 145–158. doi:10.1353/rah.2012.0016.
- Gershon, Livia (14 March 2018). "How America Embraced Yoga". JSTOR Daily.
- Goldberg, Philip (2013). American Veda : from Emerson and the Beatles to yoga and meditation—how Indian spirituality changed the West. Three Rivers Press. ISBN 978-0-385-52135-2. OCLC 808413359.
- Hammond, Holly (2018). "The Timeline and History of Yoga in America". Yoga Journal.
- Ipsos (January 2016). "2016 Yoga in America Study". Ipsos Public Affairs. pp. 1–87.
- Hyams, Joe (2 August 1961). "Hittleman's Taking Yoga to the Ladies". The Washington Post.
- Iyengar, B. K. S. (1991) [1966]. Light on Yoga: Yoga Dipika. Thorsons. ISBN 978-1855381667.
- Jain, Andrea (2015). Selling Yoga: from Counterculture to Pop culture. Oxford University Press. ISBN 978-0-19-939024-3. OCLC 878953765.
- Jois, K. Pattabhi (November 1995). "A letter from Sri. K. Pattabhi Jois to Yoga Journal". Ashtanga Yoga Library.
- Kripalu (2019). "Our History". Kripalu Center for Yoga & Health.
- Laycock, Joseph (2013). "Yoga for the New Woman and the New Man: The Role of Pierre Bernard and Blanche DeVries in the Creation of Modern Postural Yoga". Religion and American Culture: A Journal of Interpretation. 23 (1): 101–136. doi:10.1525/rac.2013.23.1.101. JSTOR 10.1525/rac.2013.23.1.101.
- Love, Robert (2010). The Great Oom: The Improbable Birth of Yoga in America. Viking Press. ISBN 978-0670021758.
- Miller, Lisa (15 August 2009). "We Are All Hindus Now". Newsweek.
- Mishra, Debashree (3 July 2016). "Once Upon A Time: From 1918, this Yoga institute has been teaching generations, creating history". Mumbai: Indian Express.
- Pizer, Ann (6 January 2019). "The Essentials of Kripalu Yoga". Very Well Fit.
- Pizer b, Ann (8 January 2019). "Power Yoga History and Health Benefits". Very Well Fit. Archived from the original on 28 April 2019.
- Ricci, Jeanne (28 August 2007). "Paramahansa Yogananda". Yoga Journal.
- Routledge, Isobel (28 November 2014). "Meditation and modernity: an image of Marguerite Agniel". Wellcome Library.
- Schneider, Carrie (2003). American Yoga : The paths and practices of America's greatest yoga masters. Barnes & Noble. ISBN 978-0760745588.
- Schrank, Sarah (2014). "American Yoga: The Shaping of Modern Body Culture in the United States". American Studies. 53 (1): 169–182. doi:10.1353/ams.2014.0021. Archived from the original on 2019-04-28.
- Schrank, Sarah (2016). "Naked Yoga and the Sexualization of Asana". In Berila, Beth; Klein, Melanie; Roberts, Chelsea Jackson (eds.). Yoga, the Body, and Embodied Social Change: An Intersectional Feminist Analysis. Lexington Books. ISBN 978-1-4985-2803-0.
- Singleton, Mark (2010). Yoga Body: The Origins of Modern Posture Practice. Oxford University Press. ISBN 978-0-19-539534-1. OCLC 318191988.
- Singleton, Mark (2018). "The Ancient & Modern Roots of Yoga". Yoga Journal.
- Syman, Stefanie (2010). The Subtle Body: the Story of Yoga in America. Farrar, Straus and Giroux. ISBN 978-0-374-53284-0. OCLC 456171421.
- Veenhof, Douglas (2011). White Lama: The Life of Tantric Yogi Theos Bernard, Tibet's Emissary to the New World. Harmony Books. ISBN 978-0385514323.
- Vishnudevananda, Swami (1988) [1960]. The Complete Illustrated Book of Yoga. Three Rivers Press. ISBN 0-517-88431-3.
- YJ Ashtanga (2019). "Ashtanga Yoga". Yoga Journal.
- YJ Power (2019). "Power Yoga". Yoga Journal.
- Yogananda, Paramahansa (1971) [1946]. Autobiography of a Yogi. Self-Realization Fellowship. ISBN 978-0-87612-079-8. OCLC 220261.
