= Naked Yoga (film) =

British documentary short (1974)

- Directed by: Paul Cordsen
- Written by: Paul Cordsen
- Produced by: Ronald S. Kass; Mervyn Lloyd
- Narrated by: Alexis Korner
- Cinematography: Michael Elphick
- Edited by: Richard White
- Distributed by: EMI Films
- Release date: 1974
- Running time: 24 minutes
- Country: United Kingdom
- Language: English

Naked Yoga is a 1974 British short documentary film directed by Paul Cordsen. It illustrates the practice of yoga in a natural setting and in the nude. The film includes images of women practicing yoga in Cyprus and in a studio. These visuals are interspersed with images of Eastern art and psychedelic effects. The narrator Alexis Korner relates the practice to Buddhist philosophy. It was shown on television in the UK, and has been available for several years on YouTube.

The film was nominated for an Oscar in 1975, in the category Best Documentary Short Subject.

== Conservation status ==
Naked Yoga was thought to have been be a lost film. Ed Carter, documentary curator at the Academy Film Archive, began searching for the film in 2004 and eventually located a Technicolor print of the film with the help of the film's cinematographer, Michael Elphick, in 2011. That print served as the source for the Archive's restoration of the film in 2012, in partnership with the British Film Institute.

== See also ==
- Nudity in film
