= Halasana =

Inverted posture in hatha yoga

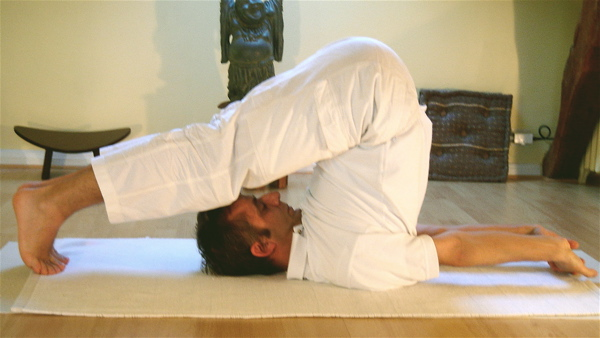
Halasana

Halasana (Sanskrit: हलासन; IAST: halāsana) or Plough pose is an inverted asana in hatha yoga and modern yoga as exercise. Its variations include Karnapidasana with the knees by the ears, and Supta Konasana with the feet wide apart.

== Etymology and origins ==
The name Halasana comes from Sanskrit हल hala, "plough" and आसन āsana, "posture" or "seat". The pose is described and illustrated in the 19th century Sritattvanidhi as Lāṇgalāsana, which also means plough pose in Sanskrit.

Karnapidasana is not found in the medieval hatha yoga texts. It is described independently in Swami Vishnudevananda's 1960 Complete Illustrated Book of Yoga in the Sivananda Yoga tradition, and by B. K. S. Iyengar in his 1966 Light on Yoga, implying that it may have older origins. The name comes from the Sanskrit words karṇa (कर्ण) meaning "ears", pīḍ (पीड्) meaning "to squeeze", and āsana (आसन) meaning "posture" or "seat".

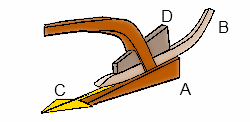
The completed pose resembles a traditional plough.

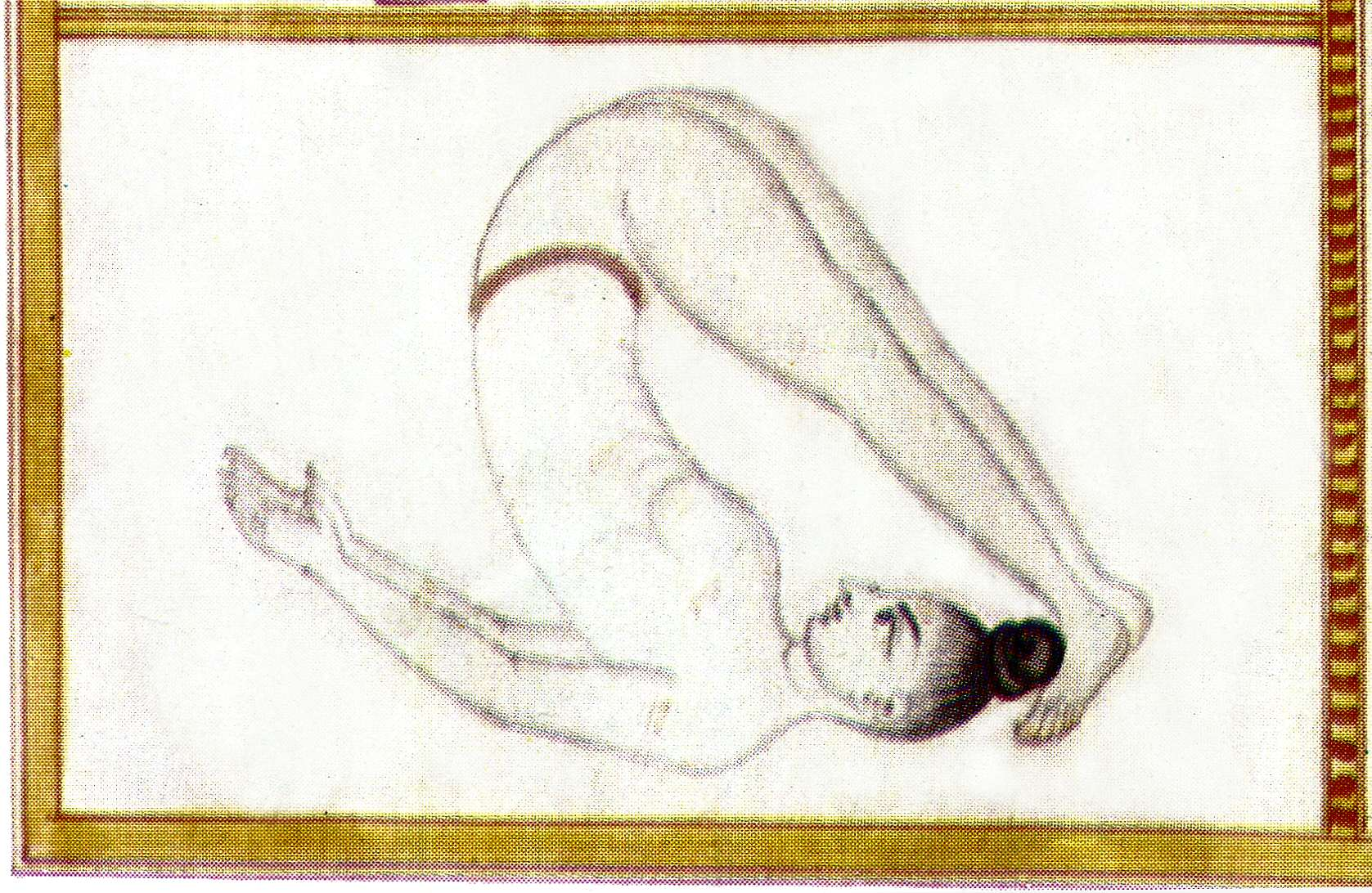
Lāṇgalāsana in the Sritattvanidhi from the Mysore Palace, before 1868

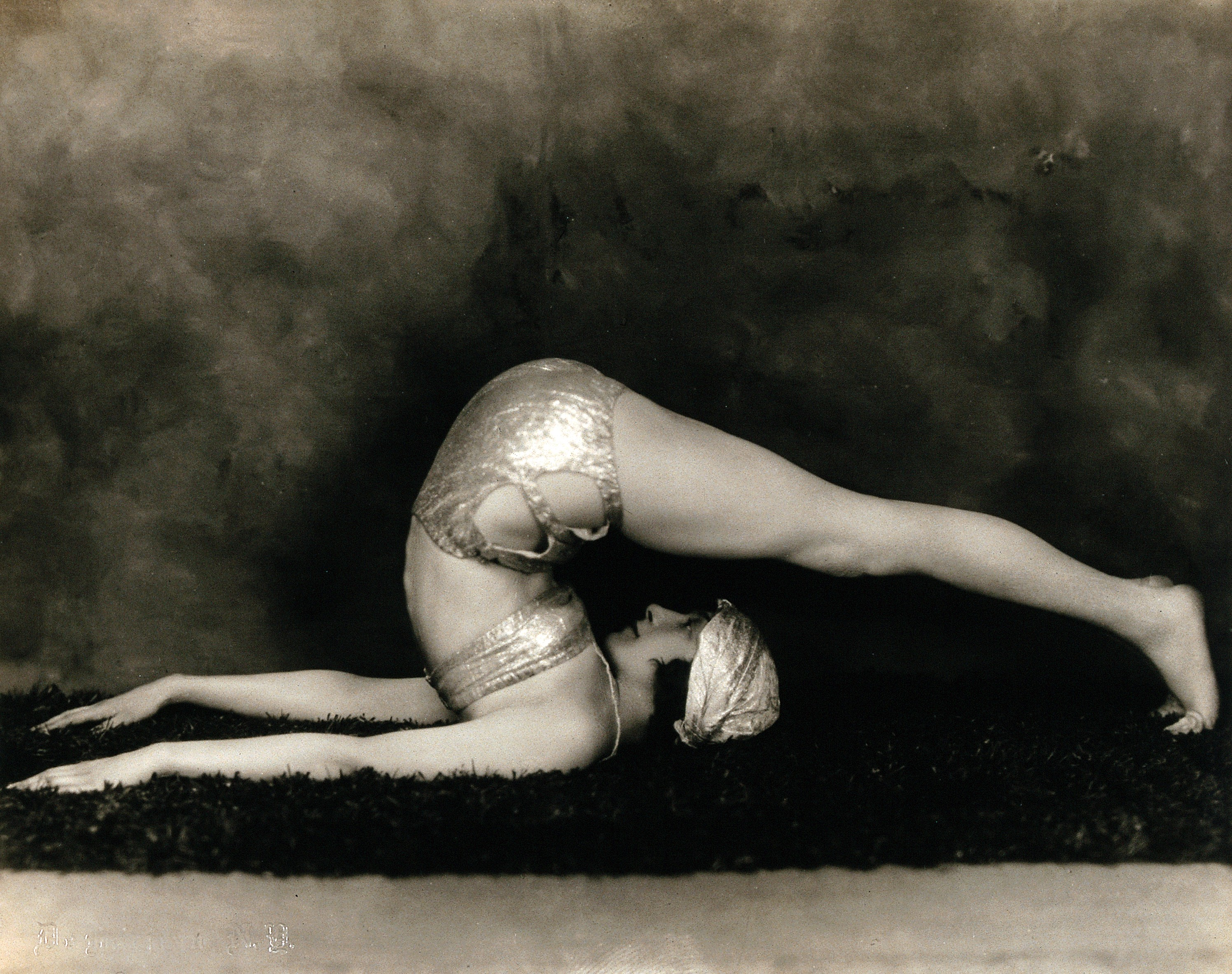
The health and beauty guru Marguerite Agniel in plough pose, c. 1928. Photograph by John de Mirjian

== Description ==
The pose is entered from Sarvangasana (shoulderstand), lowering the back slightly for balance, and moving the arms and legs over the head until the outstretched toes touch the ground near the fingertips, in a preparatory variant of the pose. The arms may then be moved to support the back into a more vertical position, giving a second variant pose. Finally, the arms may be stretched out on the ground away from the feet, giving the final pose in the shape of a traditional plough.

== Variations ==
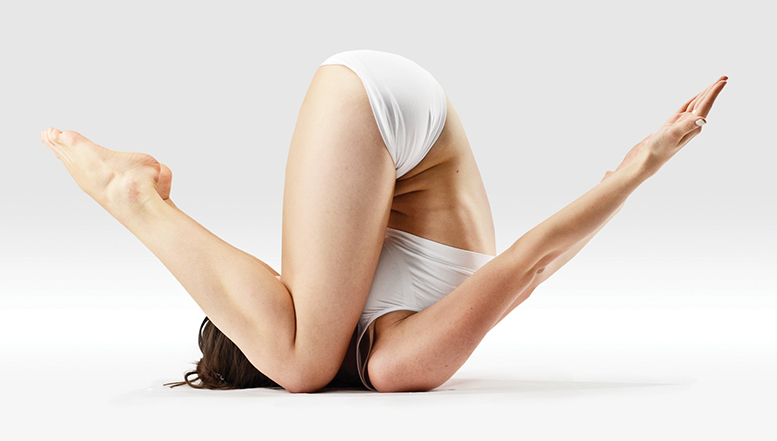
Karnapidasana, with variant arm position

Karnapidasana (ear-pressing pose) or Raja Halasana (royal plough pose) has the knees bent close to the head and grasped by the arms.

Parsva Halasana (sideways plough) has the body vertical, the trunk twisted to one side, and legs out straight with the feet touching the ground (to that side).

Supta Konasana (supine angle pose) has the legs as wide apart as possible, the toes on the ground, like an inverted Upavistha Konasana; the fingertips may grasp the big toes.

All these variations may be performed as part of a cycle starting from Sarvangasana (Shoulderstand).

== See also ==
- List of asanas

== Sources ==
- Iyengar, B. K. S. (1979) [1966]. Light on Yoga: Yoga Dipika. Unwin Paperbacks. ISBN 978-1855381667.
- Mehta, Silva; Mehta, Mira; Mehta, Shyam (1990). Yoga: The Iyengar Way. Dorling Kindersley.
- Sjoman, Norman E. (1999) [1996]. The Yoga Tradition of the Mysore Palace. Abhinav Publications. ISBN 81-7017-389-2.
