= Ron Kass =

American businessman (1935–1986)

Ron Kass (March 30, 1935 – October 17, 1986) was an American businessman, recording executive, and film producer. Kass worked with at least four recording companies: Liberty, MGM, Warner Brothers, and Apple Records.

== Early life ==
Born Ronald Stanley Kashinoff in Philadelphia, Pennsylvania, his family changed the name to Kass when they moved to California. He attended Fairfax High School in Los Angeles where he played in a band that became Tijuana Brass and then got a degree in accounting from UCLA.

== Career ==
Kass married and started working for Liberty Records. He was promoted to overseas manager and eventually president of Liberty. He was brought in to head Apple Records, the label set up by The Beatles in 1968.

In 1969, Allen Klein was appointed The Beatles' business manager. He viewed Kass as a threat due to his role in the commercial success of Apple Records, so Kass was forced from his position. He was succeeded in the position by his former deputy Jack Oliver.

Kass's film producing credits included Melody (1971), The Optimists (1973) starring Peter Sellers, Naked Yoga (1974) nominated for an Oscar for Best Documentary Short Subject, The Stud (1978) and The Bitch (1979) both based on novels by Jackie Collins, and starring her sister Joan Collins (to whom Kass was married at the time).

He and Collins appeared on Tattletales in 1977 and 1982.

== Personal life ==
With Anita his first wife, they had their first son David, and then Kass moved to London but settled his family in Lugano, Switzerland, where they had two more sons, Roberto and Jonathan. After their divorce in 1969, Anita raised their children in Lugano.

In 1972, Kass married Joan Collins. They had a daughter, Katyana ("Katie"), born in 1972. Kass and Collins were divorced in 1983. Collins provided for Kass's medical care when he was ill with terminal cancer, in addition to flying his sons from Switzerland to their father. On October 17, 1986, in Los Angeles, California, Kass died from cancer at the age of 51.
