= Marguerite Agniel =

American actress (1891–1971)

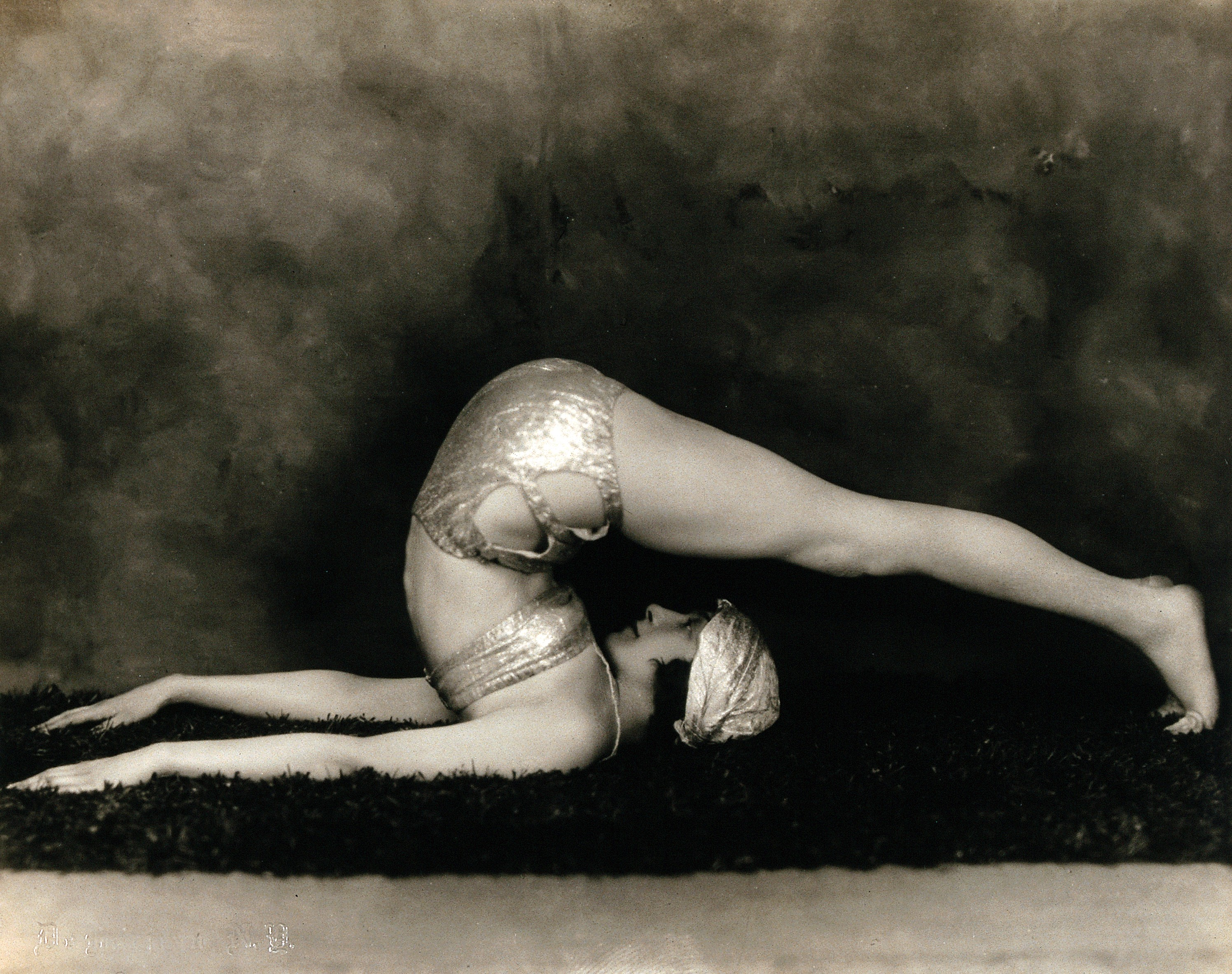
- In Halasana, Plough Pose. Photograph by John de Mirjian, c. 1928
- Born: January 21, 1891
- Died: c. 1971 (aged 79–80)
- Known for: Actress, dancer
- Notable work: The Art of the Body

Marguerite Agniel (1891 – c. 1971) was a Broadway actress and dancer, who then became a health and beauty guru in New York in the early 20th century. She is known for her 1931 book The Art of the Body: Rhythmic Exercise for Health and Beauty, one of the first to combine yoga and nudism.

After appearing in Vogue in 1926, she wrote for Physical Culture and other magazines. In the 1930s, she published a series of books, including Body Sculpture and Your Figure, advocating health and beauty practices, illustrated mainly with photographs of herself.

Agniel stated that her dance technique derived from Ruth St. Denis (who had followed François Delsarte), while her "aesthetic athletics" came mainly from the physical culture advocate, Bernarr Macfadden. She described the sexologist Havelock Ellis and the musicologist Sigmund Spaeth as major influences.

== Life ==
Marguerite Agniel was born on January 21, 1891, one of the six children of George Agniel and Ada Lescher Flowers. Her father, who had worked as a farmer in Indiana, died in 1893 while she was an infant, leaving her mother to raise the children alone. The Agniel family was French-Jewish; her mother's family was English. She was married in New York on March 21, 1917.

Agniel performed in Broadway plays including The Amber Empress with music by Zoel Parenteau in 1916, and Raymond Hitchcock's Pin Wheel in 1922.

== Career ==
Agniel appeared in the November 15, 1926, issue of Vogue, demonstrating slimming exercises in the form of floor stretches, with postures close to the yoga asanas Salabhasana, Supta Virasana, Sarvangasana and Halasana. She wrote for Physical Culture magazine in 1927 and 1928. She wrote a piece titled "The Mental Element in Our Physical Well-Being" for The Nudist, an American magazine, in 1938; it showed nude women practising yoga, accompanied by a text on attention to the breath. The social historian Sarah Schrank comments that it made perfect sense at this stage of the development of yoga in America to combine nudism and yoga, as "both were exercises in healthful living; both were countercultural and bohemian; both highlighted the body; and both were sensual without being explicitly erotic."

In 1931 she wrote the book The Art of the Body: Rhythmic Exercise for Health and Beauty, illustrated mainly with photographs of herself; she notes in the preface that her dance technique derives from Ruth St. Denis (who in turn followed François Delsarte), but that her "system of 'aesthetic athletics'" was based mainly on that of Bernarr Macfadden, an advocate of physical culture. She names the sexologist Havelock Ellis and the musicologist Sigmund Spaeth as major influences, stating that both had shown "an extraordinarily intuitive understanding" of her work. Agniel was depicted in an "elegant, though sharply ironic" Palladium photographic print by the Canadian photographer Margaret Watkins, titled "Head and Hand". It shows her hand holding a portrait sculpture head of herself by Jo Davidson.

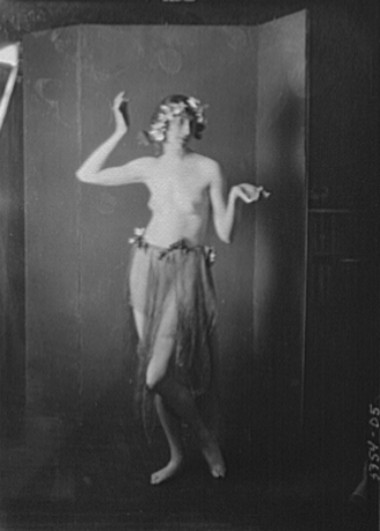
Topless, c. 1923

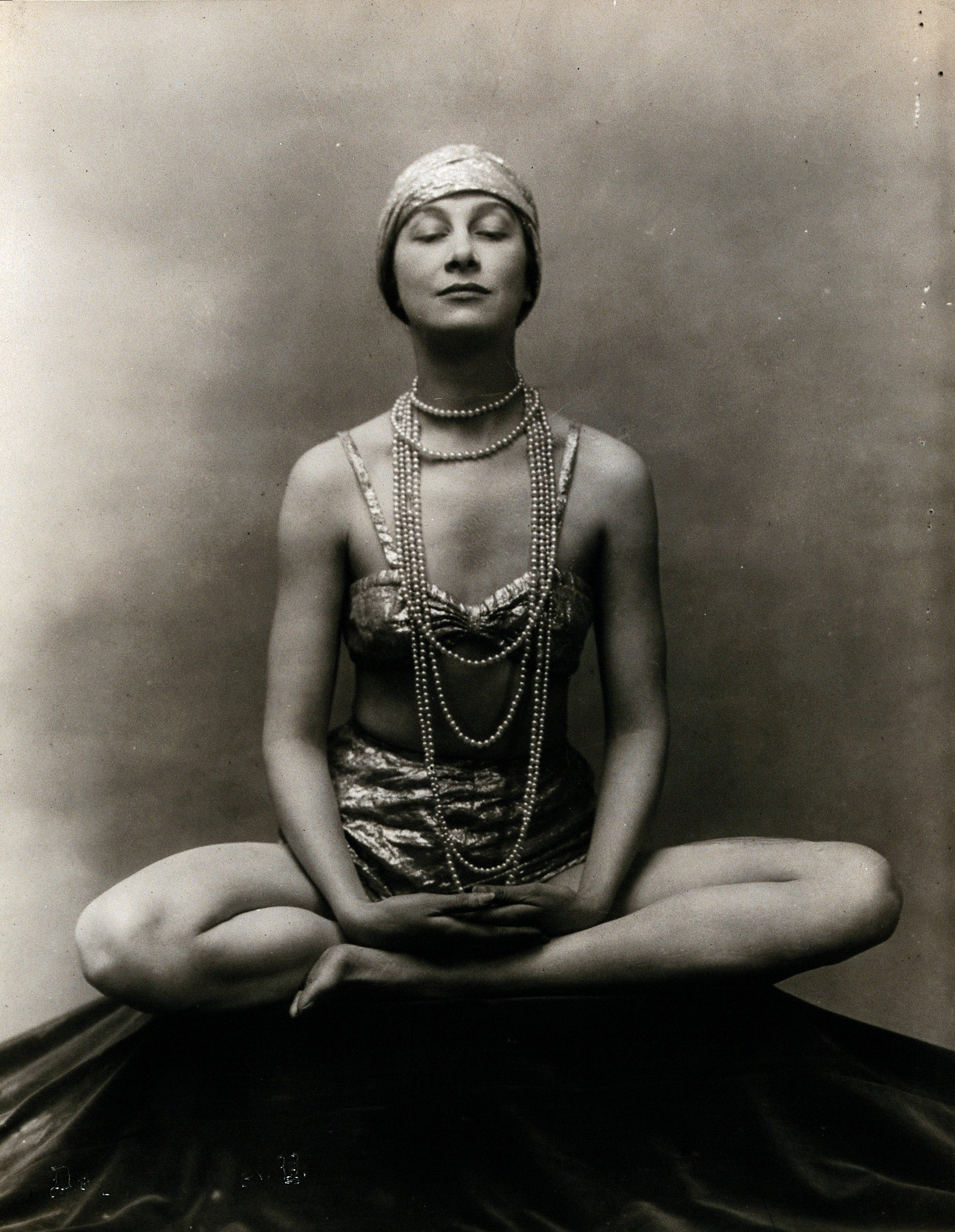
In "Buddha position", Muktasana. Photograph by John de Mirjian, c. 1928

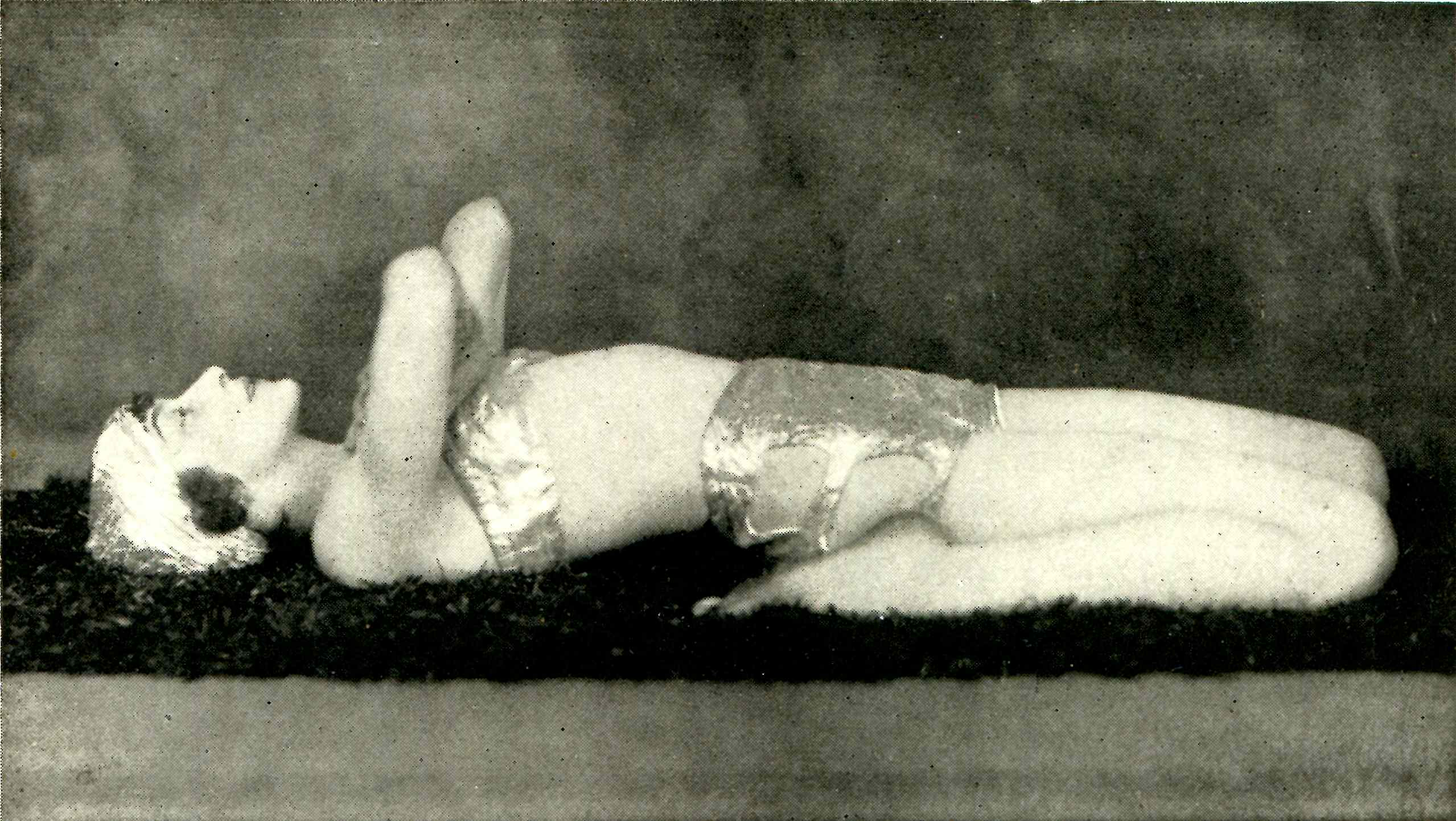
In Supta Virasana, demonstrating "A good exercise for the back and abdominal muscles". Photograph by John de Mirjian, c. 1928

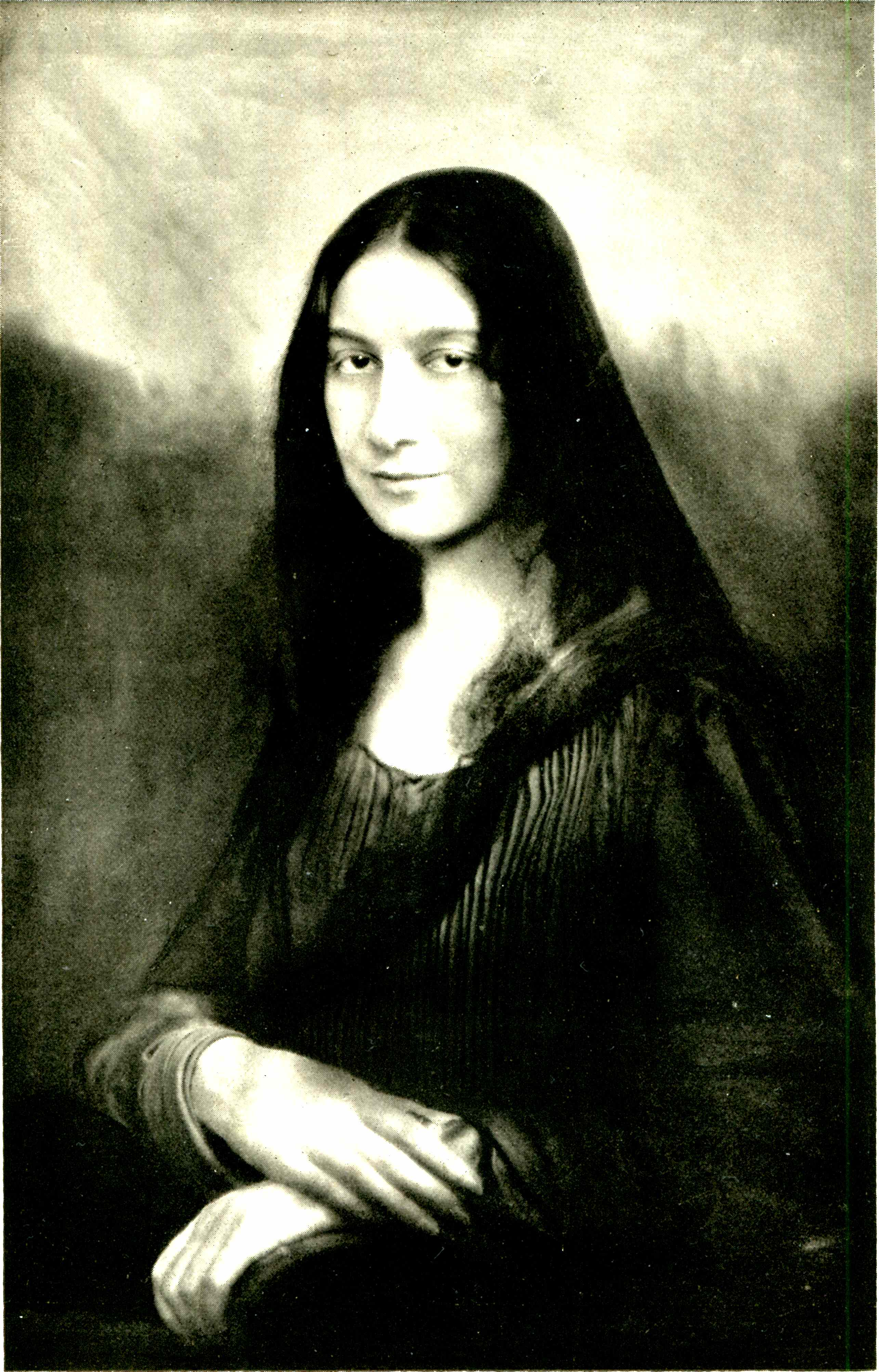
"As Mona Lisa" by Robert Henri, c. 1929

== Reception ==
"Elegant, though sharply ironic": "Head and Hand" photographic portrait of Agniel by Margaret Watkins, 1925, including portrait sculpture head by Jo Davidson

Agniel's friend, the sexologist Havelock Ellis wrote in a letter to Louise Stevens Bryant in 1936 that Agniel's books were "full of beautiful illustrations, nearly all of herself. She has a wonderful art of posing, & they are largely nudes, though she is no longer young." Devon Smither describes Agniel as "a leading health and beauty guru", and the Art of the Body as "a moralizing exercise manual" providing a mixture of exercises, advice on cosmetics, and spiritual guidance.

The scholars Mary O'Connor and Katherine Tweedie comment that Watkins's portraits of Agniel were circulated sometimes as artistic "nudes", sometimes as portraits, and sometimes as instances of "a regime of exercise and body modification". They write that since Agniel chose to use these photographs of herself, she is presenting them "not as the passive victim of an objectifying male gaze ... but as the means of promulgating her own vision of the world and her own expertise. She circulates her body as an image of the ideal and for commercial profit."

== Works ==
- 1931 The Art of the Body. London: Batsford.
- 1931 "Dancing Mothers and Dancing Daughters", Hygeia 9:344-348
- 1933 Body Sculpture. New York: E.H. & A.C. Friedrichs.
- 1936 Your Figure. Garden City, N.Y.: Doubleday, Doran & Company and also published in 1936 as Creating Body Beauty, New York: Bernard Ackerman.

== See also ==
- Mary Bagot Stack
- Genevieve Stebbins
