= Virasana =

Kneeling posture in modern yoga

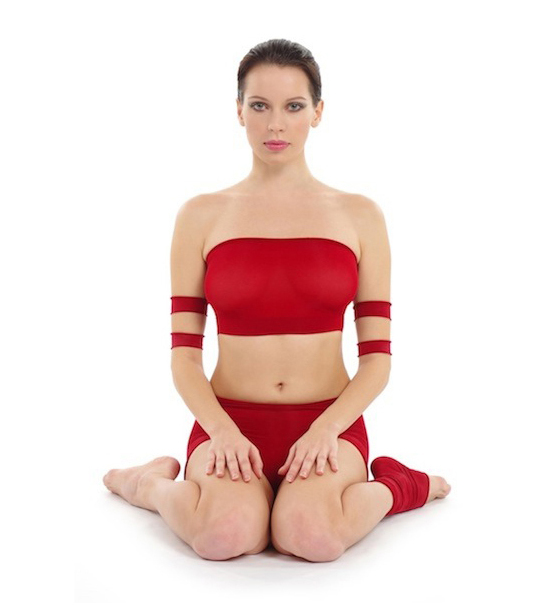
Virasana

Virasana (Sanskrit: वीरासन; IAST: vīrāsana) or Hero Pose is a kneeling asana in modern yoga as exercise. Medieval hatha yoga texts describe a cross-legged meditation asana under the same name. Supta Virasana is the reclining form of the pose; it provides a stronger stretch.

== Etymology and origins ==
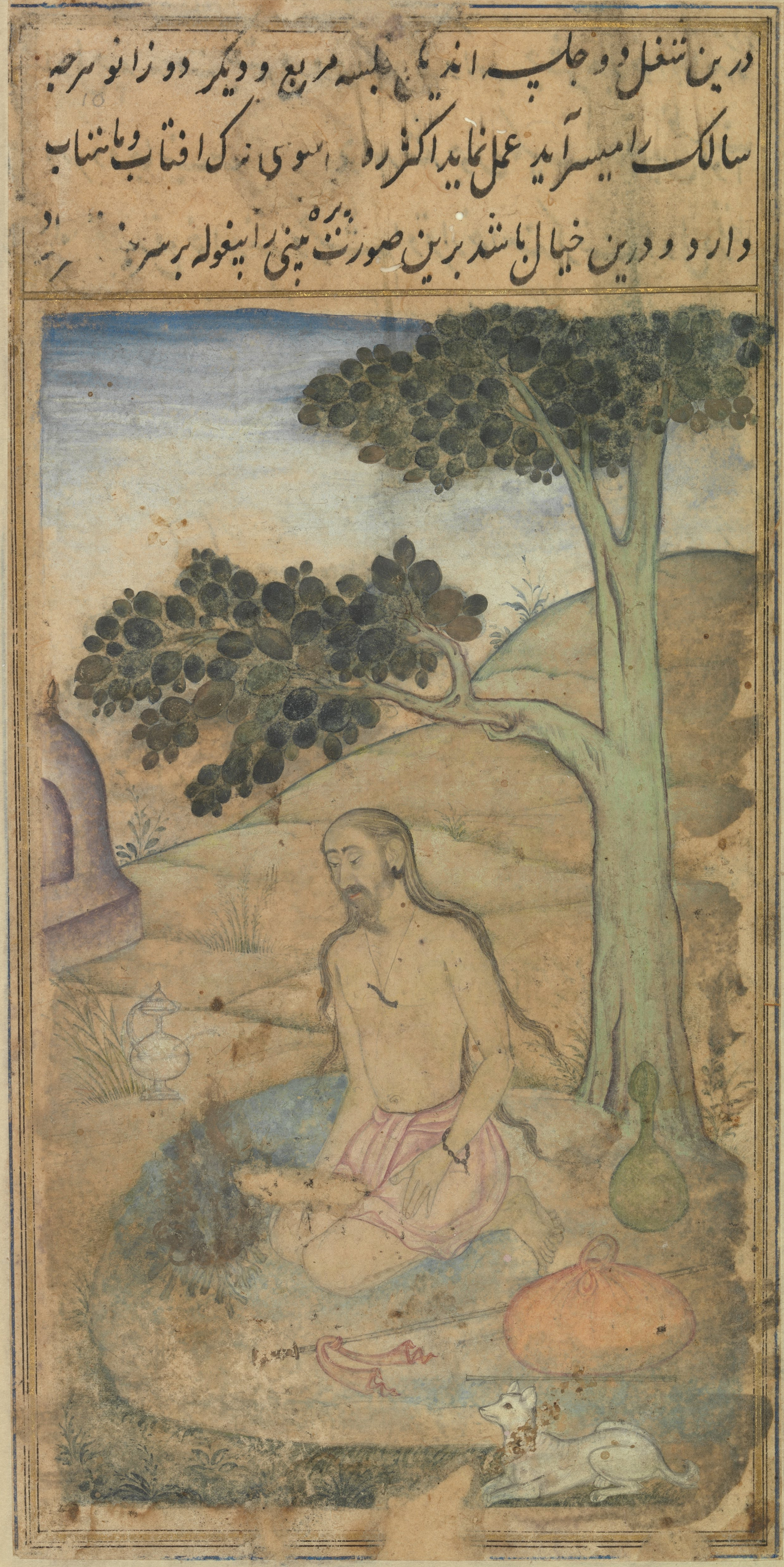
Virasana in the Mughal illustration to the treatise Bahr al-Hayat, c. 1600–1605. Chester Beatty Library

The name comes from the Sanskrit words वीर vira meaning "hero", and आसन āsana meaning "posture" or "seat"; supta (सुप्त) means "reclined".

The name virasana is ancient, being found in the 8th century Pātañjalayogaśāstravivaraṇa (2.46-48) and the 13th century Vāsiṣṭha Saṁhitā (1.72), but in those texts the description is of a cross-legged meditation seat. The modern kneeling pose is found in 20th-century texts such as B.K.S. Iyengar's Light on Yoga; it is mentioned in Ashtanga (vinyasa) yoga texts (e.g. Maehle 2011, who recommends it for lengthening the quadriceps muscle).

The yoga scholar Mark Singleton notes that a pose similar to Supta Virasana was described in Niels Bukh's early 20th century Danish text Primitive Gymnastics. Swami Kuvalayananda incorporated Supta Virasana into his system of exercises in the 1920s, from where it was taken up by the influential yoga teacher Tirumalai Krishnamacharya.

== Description ==
Virasana is a basic kneeling asana and the starting position for several forward and backward bends and certain twists. Virasana may also be used as an alternative to other seated asanas such as the padmasana (lotus pose) for meditation. The pose is entered by kneeling down with the knees together, and separating the feet so that the buttocks can rest on the floor. Beginners may instead place one foot on top of the other and sit on them, or may place a cushion between the feet and sit on that to practice. The pose is one of the few that may be performed straight after eating.

Virasana places the knees at risk of injury if hip extension and rotation are inadequate, in which case the pose requires support under the buttocks to allow the hips to extend. The pose should be avoided if there is any existing knee injury.

== Variations ==
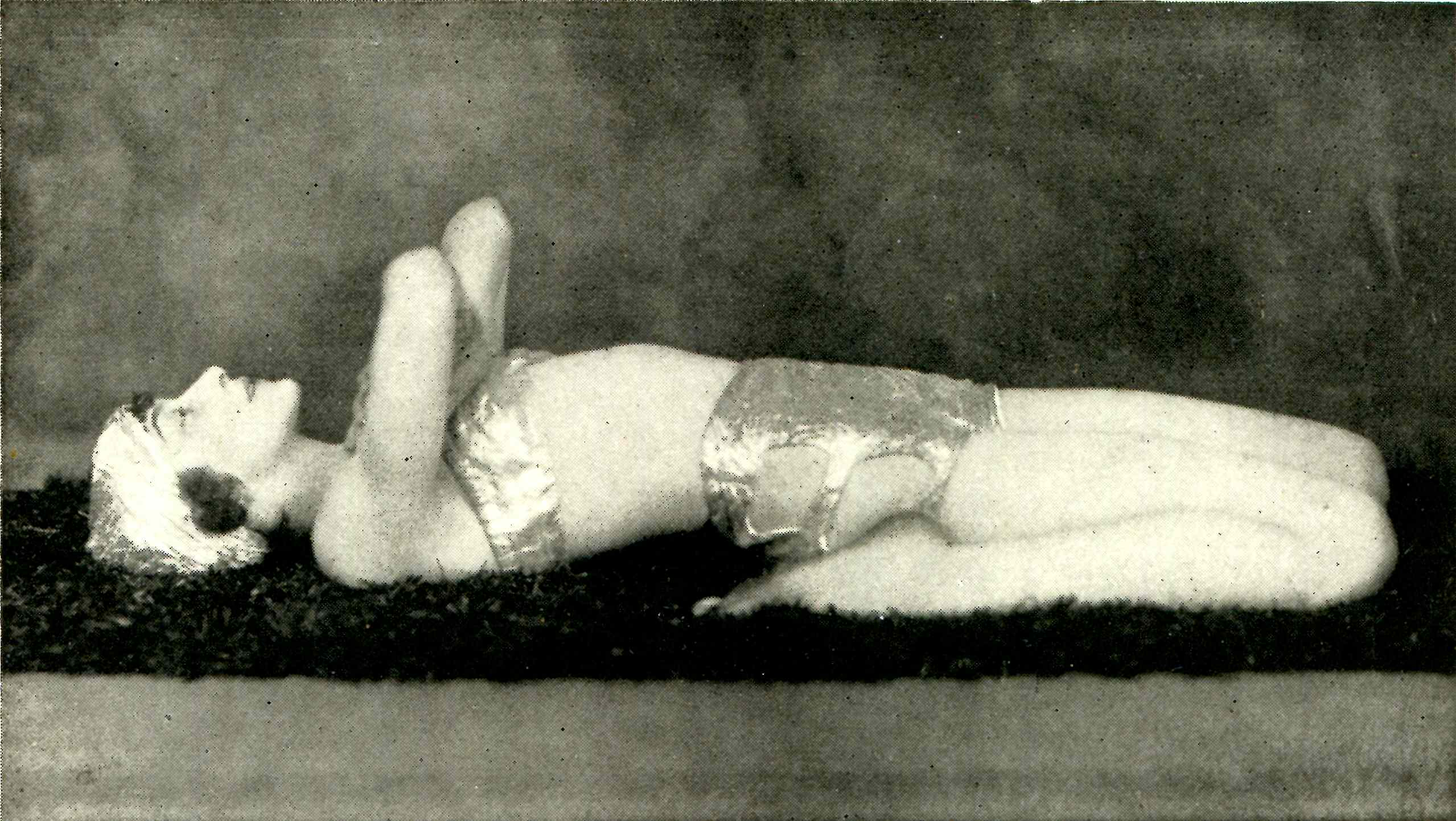
Early usage: health and beauty guru Marguerite Agniel in Supta Virasana. Studio photograph by John de Mirjian, c. 1928

Adho Mukha Virasana (downward facing hero pose) has the body stretching forward and down, the hands reaching forward to the ground. It is a counterpose following chest-opening asanas. In addition, it can be used as a recovery position throughout a challenging sequence. Therapeutic applications include releasing the spine, helping to alleviate lower back pain, and shoulder opening

Supta Virasana (reclining hero pose) has the body reclining on the back, the hands either beside the thighs or stretched over the head.

Eka Pada Supta Virasana (One-Legged Reclining Hero Pose) or Ardha Supta Virasana (Half Reclined Hero Pose) has one leg folded under the body while the other is extended forwards.

Light on Yoga shows Yogadandasana as a variant of Virasana, one bent leg being rotated inwards until the foot supports the armpit on the same side.

== See also ==
- List of asanas
- Simhasana, Lion pose, which has the legs in Virasana
- Vajrasana, Thunderbolt pose, another kneeling asana

== Sources ==
- Iyengar, B. K. S. (1979) [1966]. Light on Yoga: Yoga Dipika. Thorsons. ISBN 978-1855381667.
- Kaminoff, Leslie; Matthews, Amy (2012). Yoga Anatomy. The Breath Trust. ISBN 978-0-7360-6278-7.
- Mallinson, James; Singleton, Mark (2017). Roots of Yoga. Penguin Books. ISBN 978-0-241-25304-5. OCLC 928480104.
