= Naked yoga =

Practice of yoga without clothes

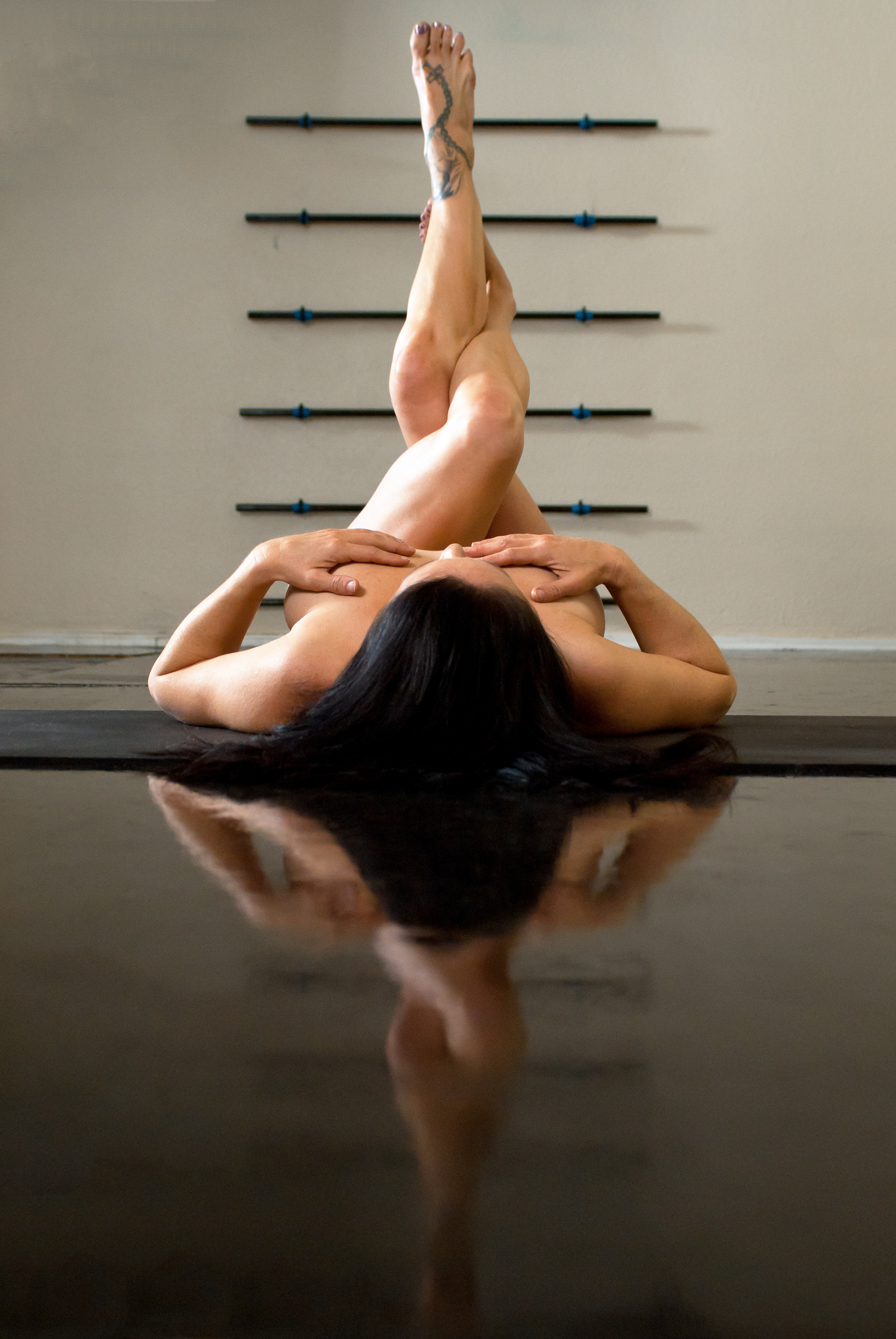
A woman doing naked yoga

Naked yoga or nude yoga (Sanskrit nagna yoga or vivastra yoga) is the practice of yoga without clothes. It has existed since ancient times as a spiritual practice, and is mentioned in the 7th–10th century Bhagavata Purana and by the Ancient Greek geographer Strabo.

Early advocates of naked yoga in modern times include the gymnosophists such as Blanche de Vries, and the actress and dancer Marguerite Agniel.

In the 21st century, the practice is gaining popularity, notably in western societies that have more familiarity with social nudity.

== Ancient times ==
Yoga has been practiced naked since ancient times. In the Bhagavata Purana (written c. 800–1000 AD), it is mentioned:

A person in the renounced order of life may try to avoid even a dress to cover himself. If he wears anything at all, it should be only a loincloth, and when there is no necessity, a sannyāsī should not even accept a daṇḍa. A sannyāsī should avoid carrying anything but a daṇḍa and kamaṇḍalu.

Alexander the Great reached India in the 4th century BC. Along with his army, he took Greek academics with him who later wrote memoirs about the geography, people, and customs they saw. One of Alexander's companions was Onesicritus, quoted in Book 15, Sections 63–65 by Strabo, who describes yogins of India. Onesicritus claims those Indian yogins (like Mandanis) practiced aloofness and "different postures – standing or sitting or lying naked – and motionless".

== Spiritual nudity ==
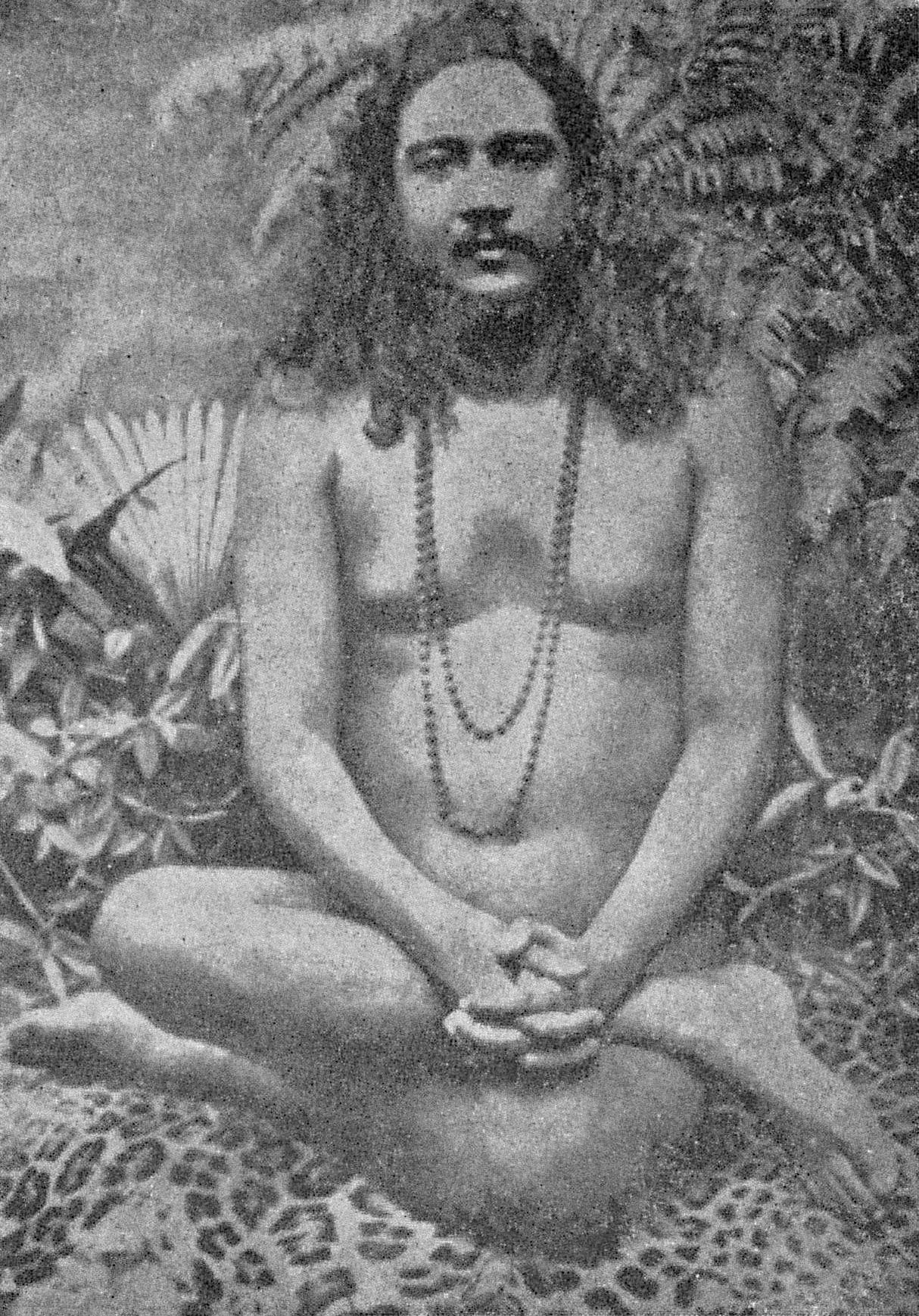
Nigamananda Paramahansa, yogi and Hindu leader, India, 1904

The practice of spiritual nudity is common among Digambara Jains, Aghori sadhus, and other ascetic groups in the dharmic religions. The order of Naga Sadhus, conspicuous in the processions and bathing ritual at the Kumbh Mela, use nudity as a part of their spiritual practice of renunciation.

== Early 20th century ==
Modern naked yoga has been practiced in Germany and Switzerland through a movement called Lebensreform. The movement had been highlighted since the end of the 19th century, highlighting yoga and nudity.

In the early 20th century, the term gymnosophy was appropriated by several groups who practiced nudity, asceticism, and meditation. Blanche de Vries combined the popularity of Oriental dancing with yoga. In 1914, she was put in charge of a yoga school for women in New York City. Five years later, she opened an institute for women, teaching Yoga Gymnosophy – a name that conveys the blending of yoga and nudism. She taught until 1982.

Marguerite Agniel, author of the 1931 book The Art of the Body: Rhythmic Exercise for Health and Beauty, wrote a piece called "The Mental Element in Our Physical Well-Being" for The Nudist, an American magazine, in 1938; it showed nude women practicing yoga, accompanied by a text on attention to the breath. The social historian Sarah Schrank comments that it made perfect sense at this stage of the development of yoga in America to combine nudism and yoga, as "both were exercises in healthful living; both were countercultural and bohemian; both highlighted the body; and both were sensual without being explicitly erotic."

== From the 1960s ==
In the West since the 1960s, naked yoga practice has been incorporated in the hippie movement and in progressive settings for well-being, such as at the Esalen Institute in California, and at the Elysium nudist colony in the Topanga Canyon, Los Angeles.

== Male-only groups ==
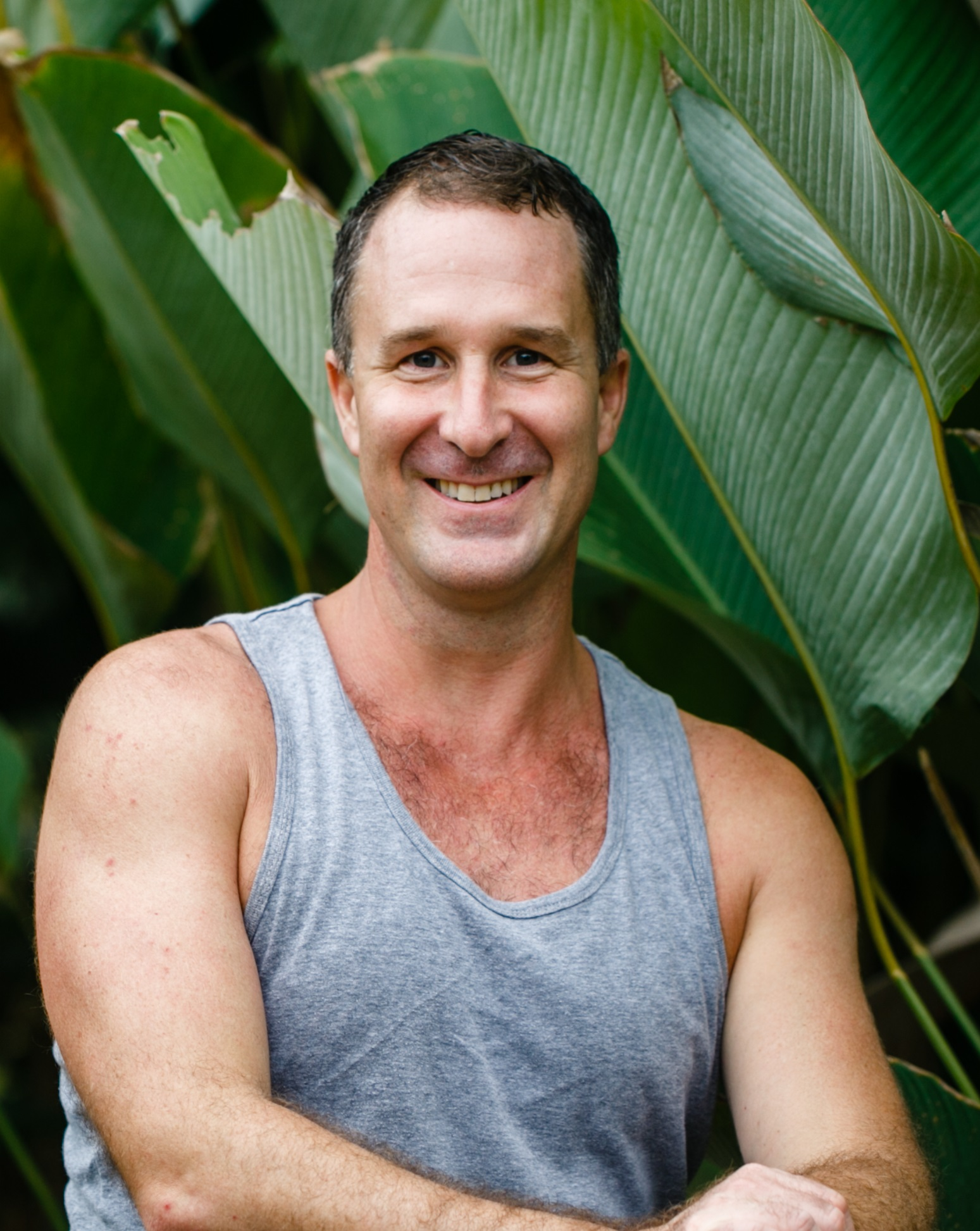
Since 2001, Aaron Star has taught male-only naked yoga in New York.

Aaron Star, owner of Hot Nude Yoga, began his version of naked yoga in April 2001. The style combined elements of Ashtanga, Kundalini, and Contact Yoga with elements of Tantra. Because of the success of Hot Nude Yoga, male-only naked yoga groups began to blossom all over the world, from London, Moscow, Madrid to Sydney, often becoming associated with the gay community. Nowadays, there are also specific naked yoga clubs for homosexuals that are not simple yoga classes, but rather communities for keeping fit and sharing sexuality. Star says that his practice affords men in cities a way to express closeness and intimacy without having sex.

Schrank writes that "the most press" has gone to Joschi Schwarz and Monika Werner's Bold and Naked studio in New York. It provides classes in tantric massage as well as both male-only and co-ed naked yoga. She praises its "positive coverage" as helping yogis of all kinds to feel good, but is concerned about the contradictory message that yoga is simultaneously "liberating and sexy".

== All genders ==
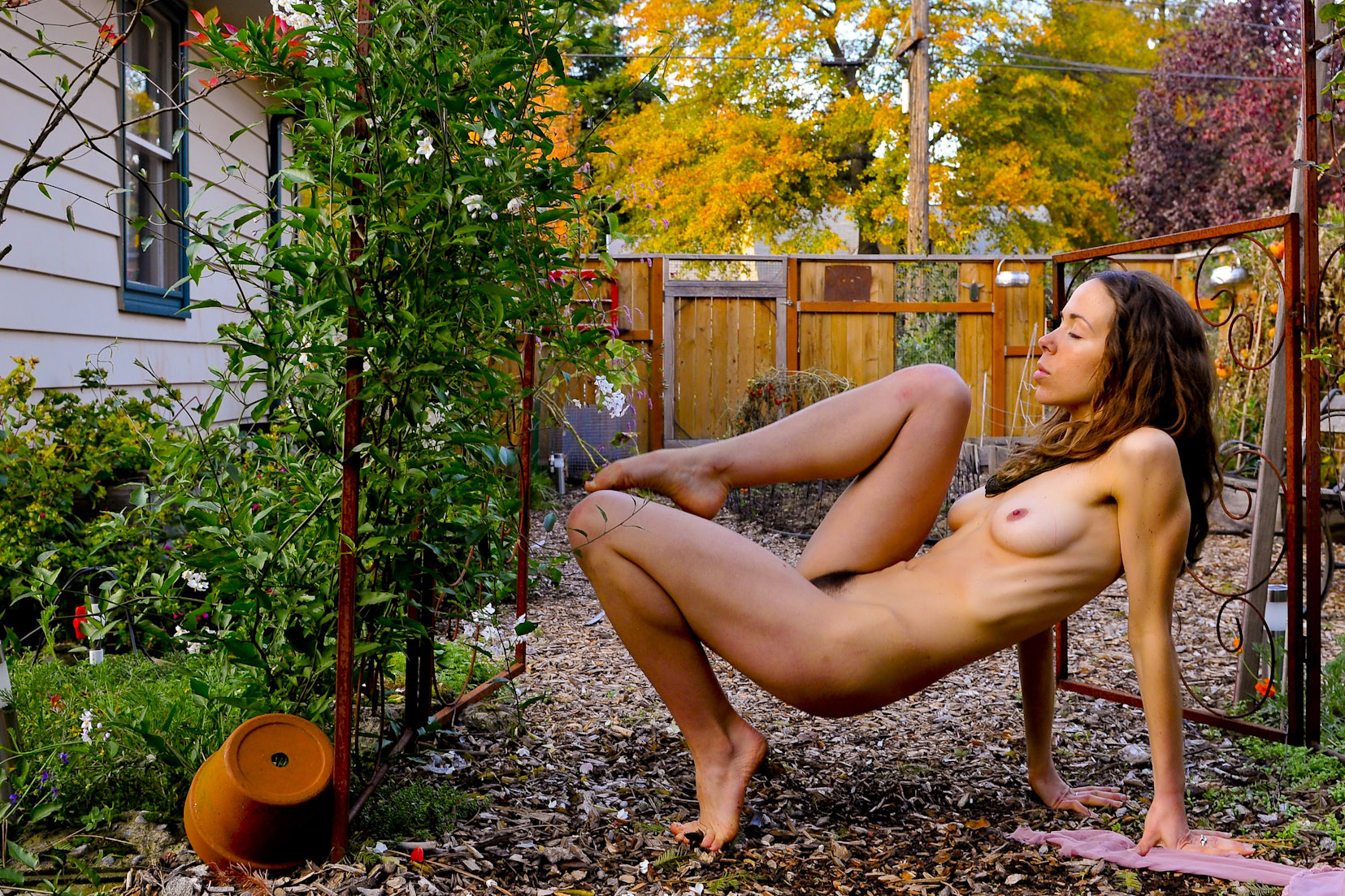
Nude garden yoga

While naked yoga had mainly been the domain of male-only groups, from 2011, courses in Britain and the United States were offered to all genders.

Schrank noted the popularity of naked yoga in 2016, with its simultaneous desire to experience one's own body in freedom, and a "troubling" sexualization of the body in yoga culture. She observed that in the United States, there is a connection between female nudity and slavery, something that has left a racist legacy. Schrank also noted the "uncomfortable" relationship of yoga and sex, not least in scandals of sexual abuse by yoga gurus, and that feminists have written critiques of the "objectification of young, white women and exclusion of women of color." On the other hand, she praises the naked yoga teacher Katrina "Rainsong" Messenger's book R.A.W. Nude Yoga: Celebrating the Human Body Temple, featuring monochrome photographs of both men and women, as impressive, tasteful, and sensual but not erotic. Schrank personally tried a naked yoga class in Los Angeles, at first finding it safe and pleasurable because not sexualized, until after two months the experience was spoiled by a class which was sexist and "overtly sexually competitive".

== Potential risks ==
Although empirical evidence specifically evaluating adverse effects of nude yoga is limited, authors have noted several potential concerns. Participation in group nudity may cause discomfort, embarrassment, or increased social physique anxiety in some individuals, particularly those with negative body image or a history of trauma. Researchers have also emphasized that psychological outcomes depend on the context in which nudity occurs and should not be generalized across different forms of public nudity.

== In film ==
Esalen's naked yoga was depicted in the 1969 comedy film Bob & Carol & Ted & Alice. Other films depicting this include 1967's I Am Curious (Yellow) with Lena Nyman, the 1973 movie The Harrad Experiment and the 1974 British short Documentary film Naked Yoga.

== See also ==
- Asana
- List of yoga hybrids
- Naturism
- Nudity
- Nudity in religion
