= Lisa Miller (journalist) =

American writer and journalist

- Born: 1963 (age 62–63); Cleveland, Ohio, United States
- Education: Oberlin College
- Occupations: Author, journalist, editor
- Writing career
- Notable work: Heaven: Our Enduring Fascination with the Afterlife
- Website: www.lisaxmiller.com

Lisa Miller (born 1963) is an American writer and journalist working for The New York Times. Formerly a contributing editor for New York magazine, a senior editor of Newsweek and a religion columnist for The Washington Post, Miller is a Wilbur Prize-winning author and a commentator on religion, history, and religious faith.

She has written Newsweek cover stories on Barack Obama, Mitt Romney, and Sarah Palin, as well as several New York cover stories on social trends.

== Personal life ==
Born in Cleveland, Ohio, Miller was raised in a secular Jewish home. She attended Oberlin College in Oberlin, Ohio, graduating in English in 1984. She worked at the Harvard Business Review, The New Yorker, and The Wall Street Journal.

Miller was married to her husband in an interfaith ceremony performed by an Episcopalian priest who worked with a rabbi on the ceremony. After the birth of her daughter, Miller joined a Jewish temple for reasons of "blood and history and culture". She describes this religious community as a "progressive, inclusive congregation".

== Career ==
Miller has worked as a writer and editor at the Harvard Business Review, The New Yorker, and The Wall Street Journal. She joined Newsweek as society editor in July 2000, becoming the religion editor and columnist in October 2006. Miller has also been the religion columnist for The Washington Post and a contributing editor for New York. In January 2024, Miller was hired by The New York Times as a domestic correspondent for the paper's Well health section.

== Books ==
- Heaven: Our Enduring Fascination with the Afterlife (2010) ISBN 978-0-06-055475-0, a history and personal memoir exploring the idea of heaven in Western culture.
