= John de Mirjian =

American photographer (1896–1928)

John de Mirjian (July 4, 1896 – September 24, 1928) was an Armenian American glamour photographer based in New York, famous for his images of celebrities, sometimes in risque poses. His brother Arto de Mirjian continued the business after John's early death.

== Biography ==
John de Mirjian was a glamour photographer in New York City; his studio was at 1595 Broadway. His fame began in 1922 and ended when he was killed in a car accident in New York in 1928 while driving a Peerless roadster on the Jericho Turnpike in Long Island at 70 miles per hour. He was accompanied by the married Broadway actress Gloria Christy, who claimed after the accident to have been de Mirjian's half-sister; she was not.

Known for his extravagant personality, passion for gambling, and compulsive womanizing, de Mirjian tolerated neither criticism nor defiance. He was infamous for erupting into temper tantrums during photo sessions when sitters failed to obey his commands. He earned an impressive $25,000 a year—placing his studio among the most profitable in New York.

He published most of his work in the magazines Art Lovers and Artists and Models. His brother Arto continued the photographic business until 1950.

He gained notoriety when the actress Louise Brooks sued him to prevent publication of his nude portraits of her.

== Works ==
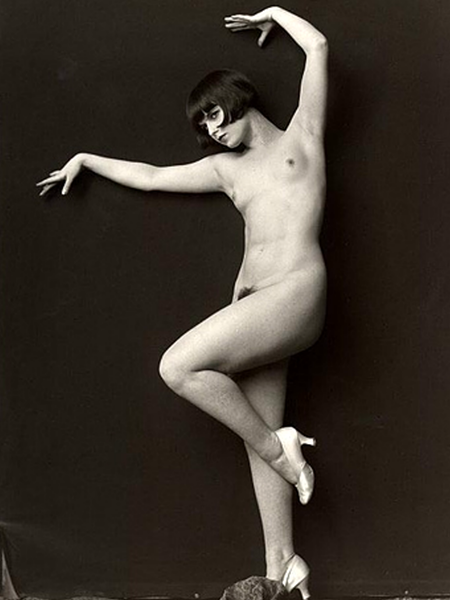
Louise Brooks took out an injunction suit to restrain de Mirjian from distributing his nude portraits of her.

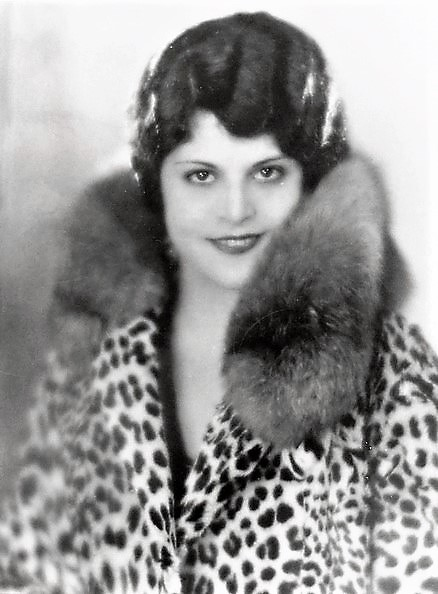
Lina Basquette, actress

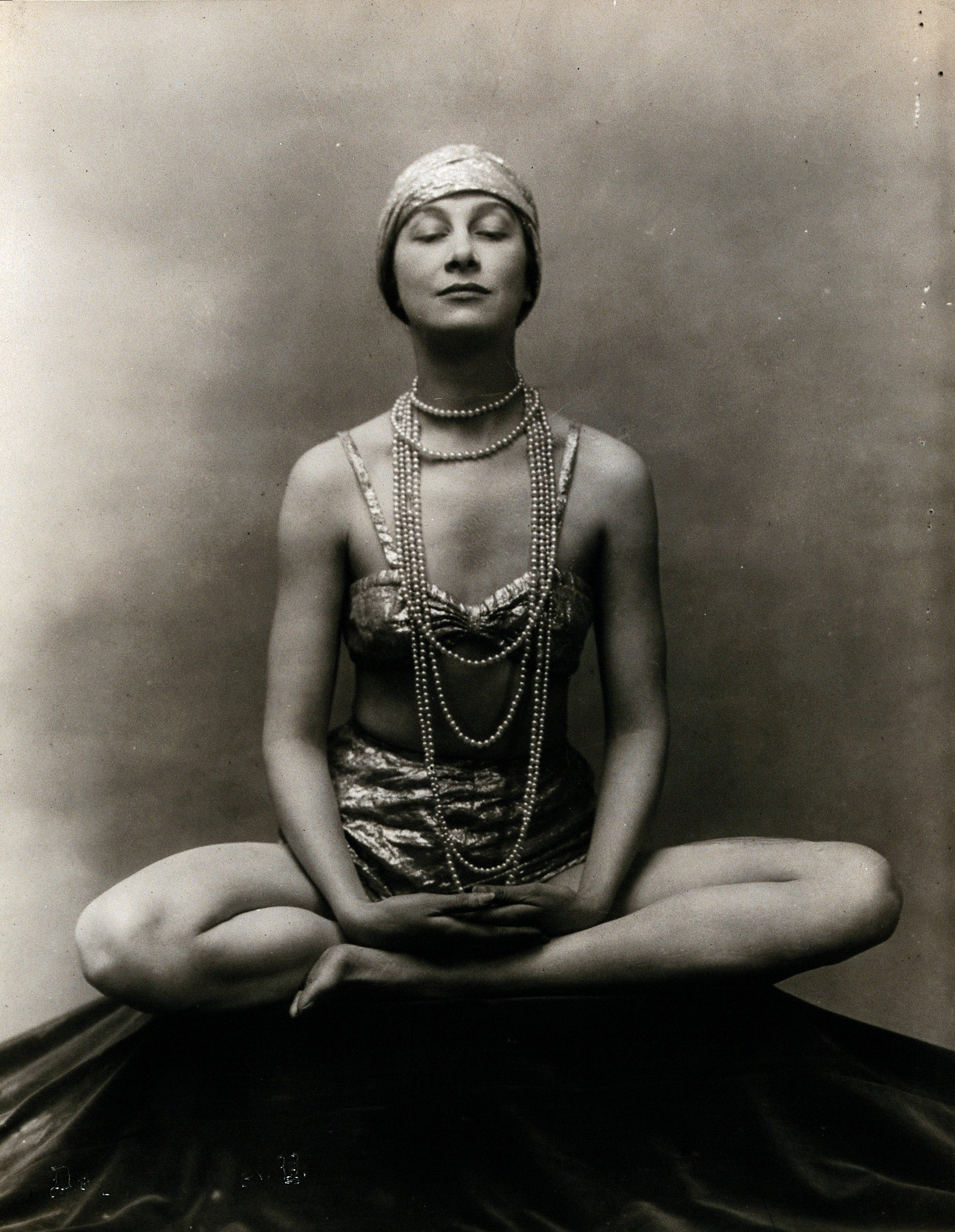
Marguerite Agniel, advocate of naked yoga, in Muktasana

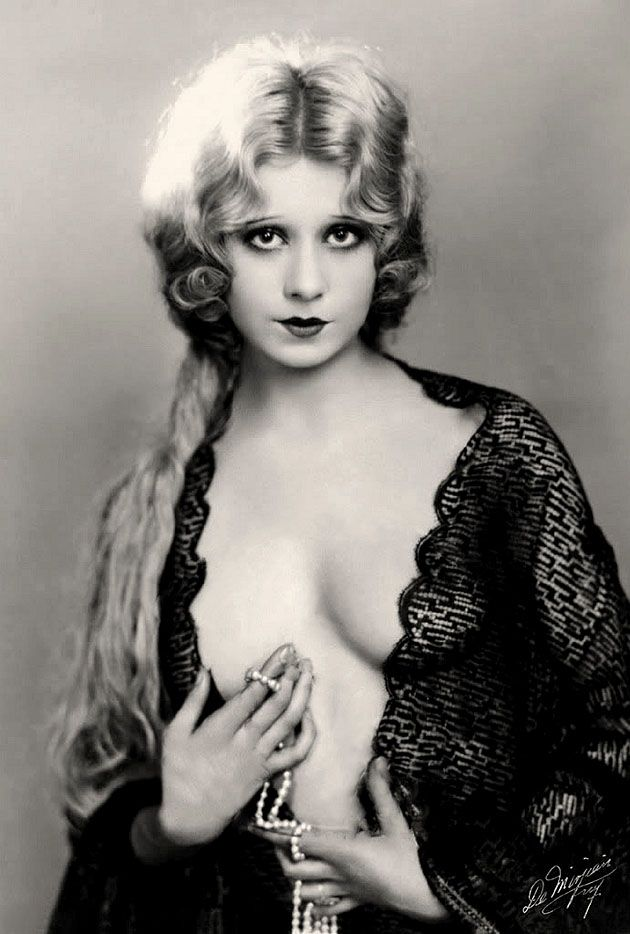
Faith Bacon, actress

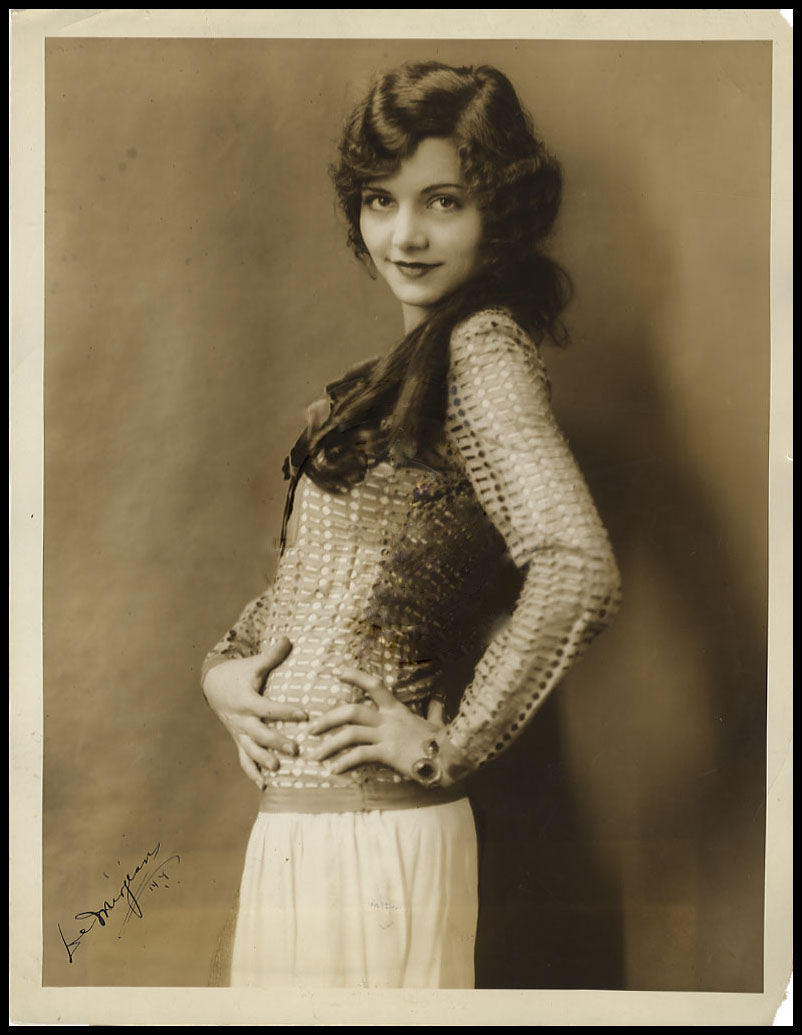
Peggy Shannon, film and Broadway actress

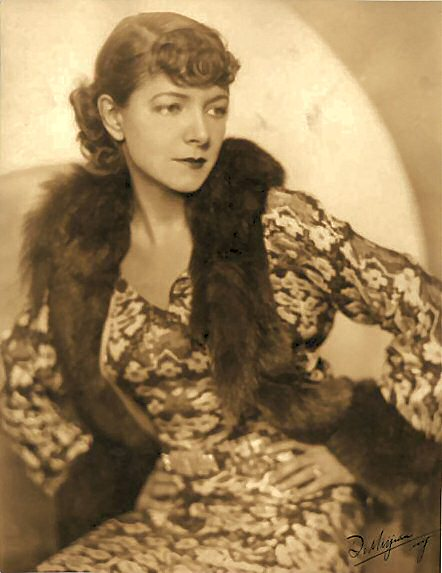
Helen Hayes, actress

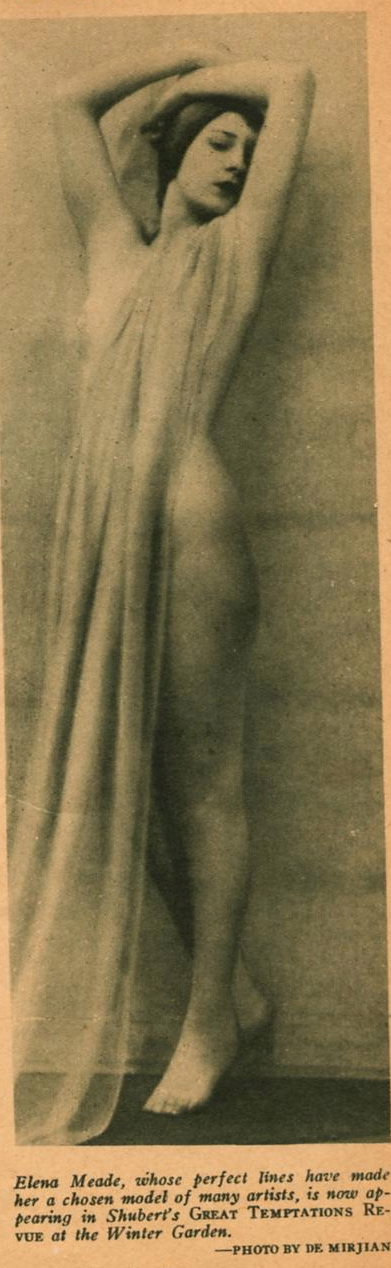
Elena Meade, model, 1926

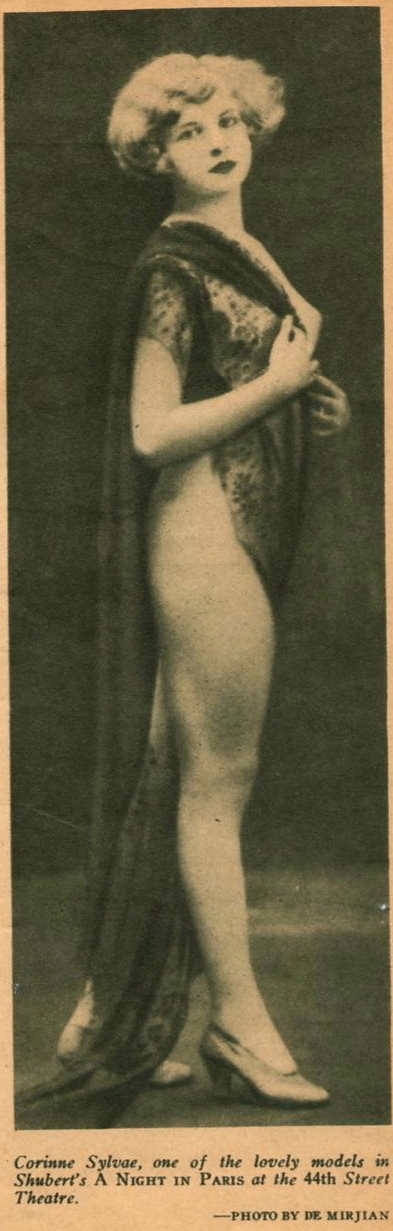
Corinne Sylvae, model, 1926

== See also ==
- Russell Ball
