= Astavakrasana =

Asymmetric hand-balancing posture in modern yoga

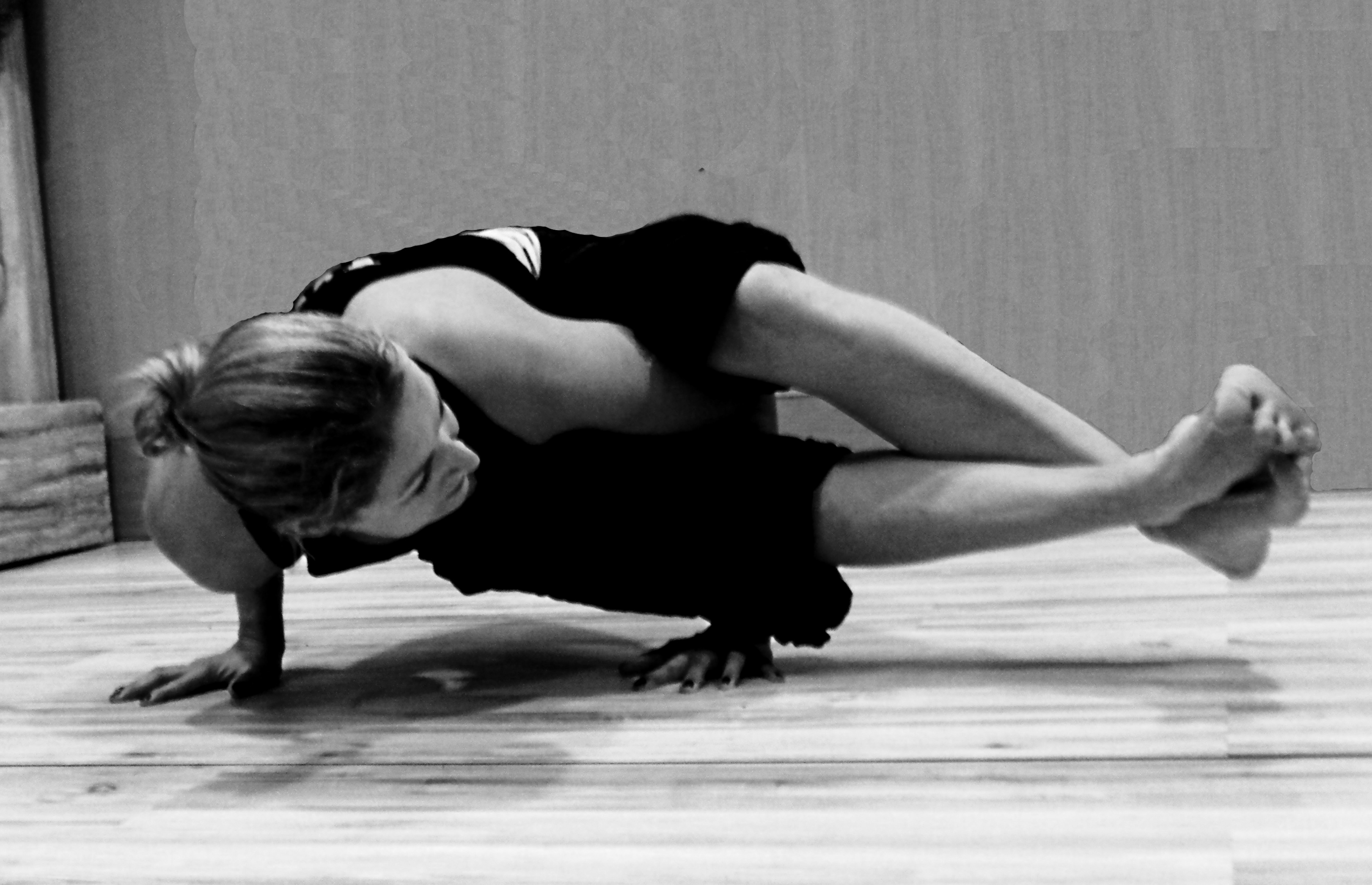
Astavakrasana

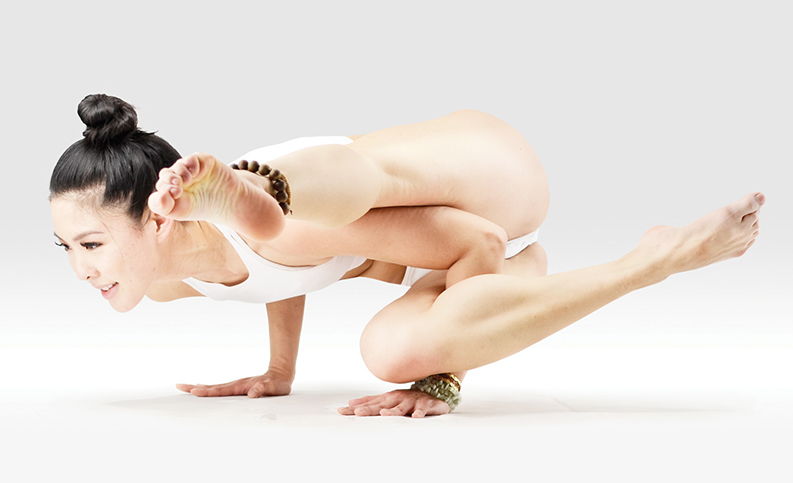
Preparing for the pose

Astavakrasana (Sanskrit: अष्टावक्रासन; IAST: Aṣṭāvakrāsana) or Eight-Angle Pose is a hand-balancing asana in modern yoga as exercise dedicated to the sage Astavakra, the spiritual guru of King Janaka.

== Etymology and origins ==
The name comes from the Sanskrit words अष्टा ashta meaning "eight", वक्र vakra meaning "bent, curved", and आसन asana meaning "posture" or "seat"; or alternatively from the myth of the sage Astavakra.

The pose was unknown in hatha yoga until the 20th century Light on Yoga, but the pose appears in the 1896 Vyayama Dipika, a manual of gymnastics, so Norman Sjoman suggests that it was one of the poses adopted into modern yoga in Mysore by Krishnamacharya. The pose would then have been taken up by his pupils Pattabhi Jois and B. K. S. Iyengar.

== Mythology ==
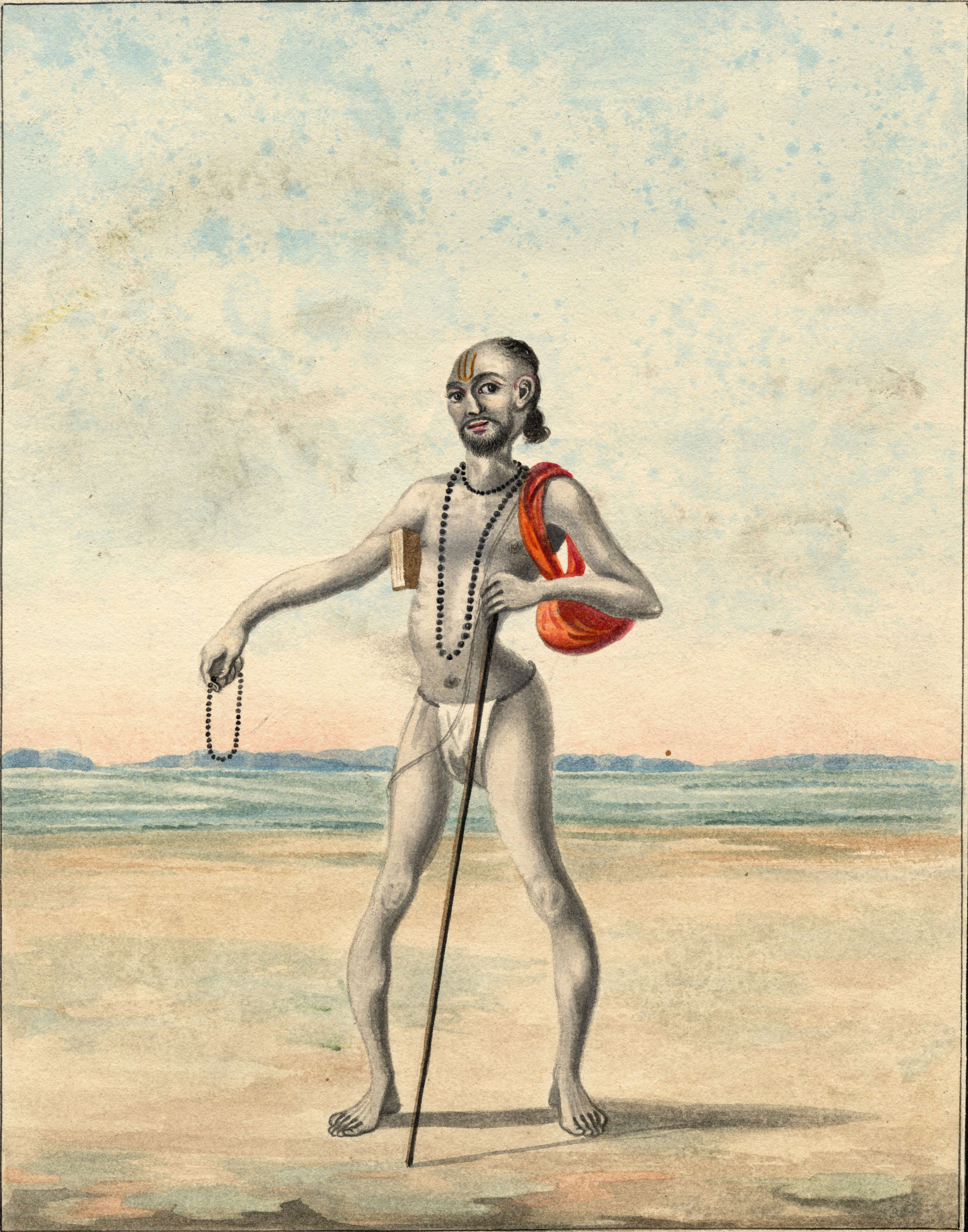
Astavakra was born with eight physical handicaps. 19th-century painting.

According to B. K. S. Iyengar's Light on Yoga, Astavakra was believed to be the spiritual guru of King Janaka, father of Sita. When he was in his mother's womb, his father Kagola recited the Vedas inaccurately, making the unborn child laugh. Kagola, furious, put a curse on the baby to be born bent in eight places, "Astavakra" meaning eight bends. Kagola was defeated in debate with the court scholar, Vandi. The young Astavakra beat Vandi in argument, and became Janaka's guru. His father blessed him for this, and his deformity vanished.

== Description ==
Astavakrasana is a hand balance with lateral twist. The pose is entered from a squatting position, one arm between the feet, the other just outside the other foot, palms on the floor. Pushing up and lifting both legs from the floor gives a variant or preparatory position, with both legs bent, one leg over one forearm, the other leg crossed over the first at the ankle. Straightening the legs gives the full pose. Preparatory poses for astavakrasana include the plank pose, Parsva Bakasana (side crane pose), Paripurna Navasana (boat pose) and others. The pose may be practised with blocks laid flat under the hands. Counter poses for Astavakrasana include Matsyasana, Paschimottanasana, and Balasana.

== See also ==
- Koundinyasana, a similar twisting arm-balancing asana
- List of asanas
