= Kukkutasana =

Hand-balancing posture in hatha yoga

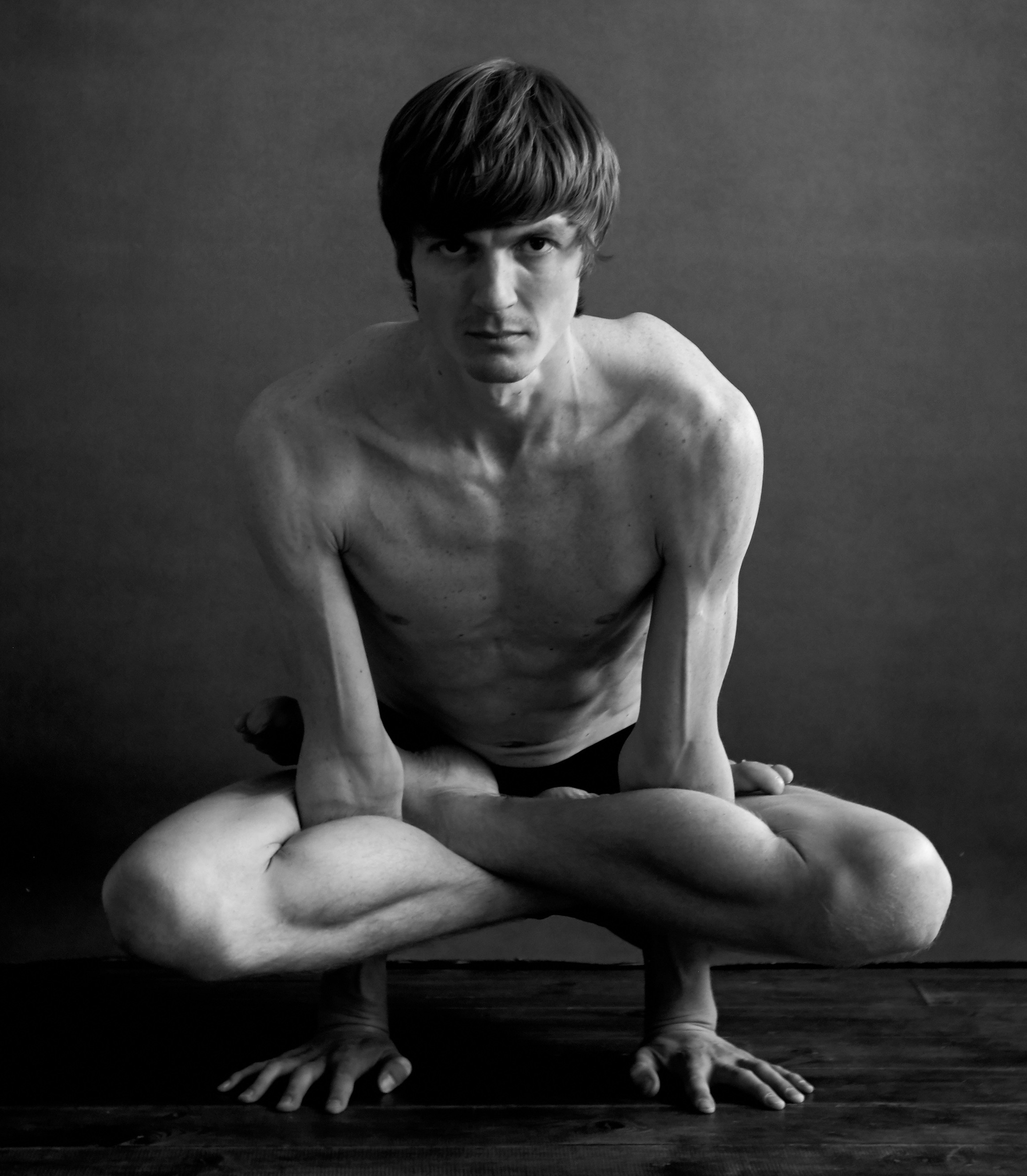
Kukkutasana

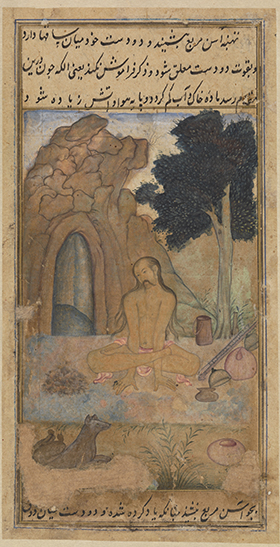
Painting of Kukkutasana in Persian manuscript Bahr al-hayat c. 1602

Kukkutasana (Sanskrit: कुक्कुटासन; IAST: Kukkuṭāsana), Cockerel Pose, or Rooster Posture is an arm-balancing asana in hatha yoga and modern yoga as exercise, derived from the seated Padmasana, lotus position. It is one of the oldest non-seated asanas. Similar hand-balancing poses known from the 20th century include Pendant Pose or Lolasana, and Scale Pose or Tulasana.

== Etymology and origins ==
The name comes from the Sanskrit words kukkuṭā meaning "cockerel" and asana (आसन) meaning "posture" or "seat".

Kukkutasana is described in medieval hatha yoga texts including the 7th century Ahirbudhnya Saṃhitā, the 13th century Vasishtha Samhita, the 15th century Haṭha Yoga Pradīpikā 1.23, the 17th century Gheraṇḍa Saṃhitā 2.31, and the Bahr al-hayat c. 1602.

Tulasana and Lolasana are not described in the medieval hatha yoga texts. Tulasana (Sanskrit: तुलासन; IAST: Tulāsana) is from Sanskrit tula (तुला) meaning "balance"; it appears in the 20th century in Swami Yogesvarananda's 1970 First Steps to Higher Yoga (spelt Tulasana), and in B. K. S. Iyengar's 1966 Light on Yoga (spelt Tolasana).

Lolasana (Sanskrit: लोलासन; IAST: Lolasana) is from Sanskrit Lol (लोल, Lola) meaning "fickle", "trembling", or "dangling". Lolasana is unknown in hatha yoga until the 20th century Light on Yoga, but it appears in the 1896 Vyayama Dipika, a manual of gymnastics, as the balancing movement exercise called jhula. Norman Sjoman suggests that it is one of the poses adopted into modern yoga in Mysore by Krishnamacharya. The pose would then have been taken up by his pupils Pattabhi Jois and B. K. S. Iyengar.

== Description ==
Kukkutasana is entered from Padmasana (Lotus Position). The hands are threaded through behind the knees, and the weight of the body is supported by the hands pressed down on the floor, the arms straight.

== Variations ==
In Urdhva Kukkutasana, the arms are not threaded through the legs; instead, the body is held nearly horizontal, the legs brought up close to the chest and resting against the backs of the extended upper arms. The point of balance is well forward of the wrists, so the arms are straight but are tilted forwards.

Parsva Kukkutasana has the body is twisted to one side, so that the left knee comes down to the outside of the right elbow, with the right knee above it; it may be entered from Sirsasana and the head then raised and the arms straightened to enter the balance.

In Tulasana, the legs and feet are crossed in Padmasana, as in Kukkutasana, but the arms are held straight beneath the shoulders, with the palms on the floor on either side of the hips.

In Lolasana, the legs and feet are held in Gomukhasana, and the hands are kept by the hips. The body is elevated and held up by the hands, fitting the descriptive term lola, meaning "dangling like an earring" or "a pendant".

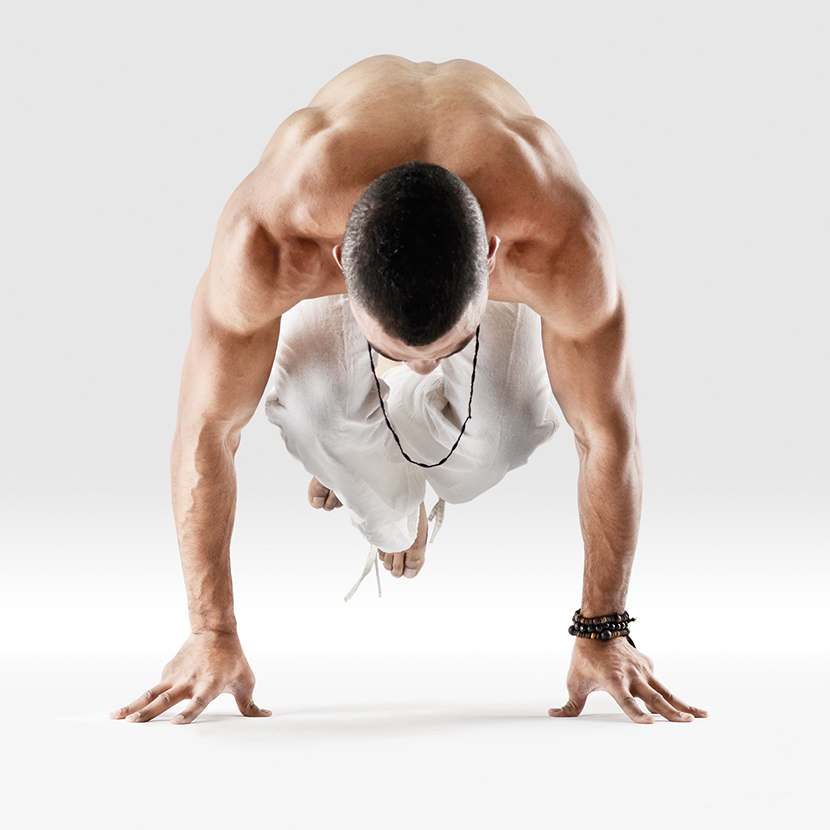
Lolasana

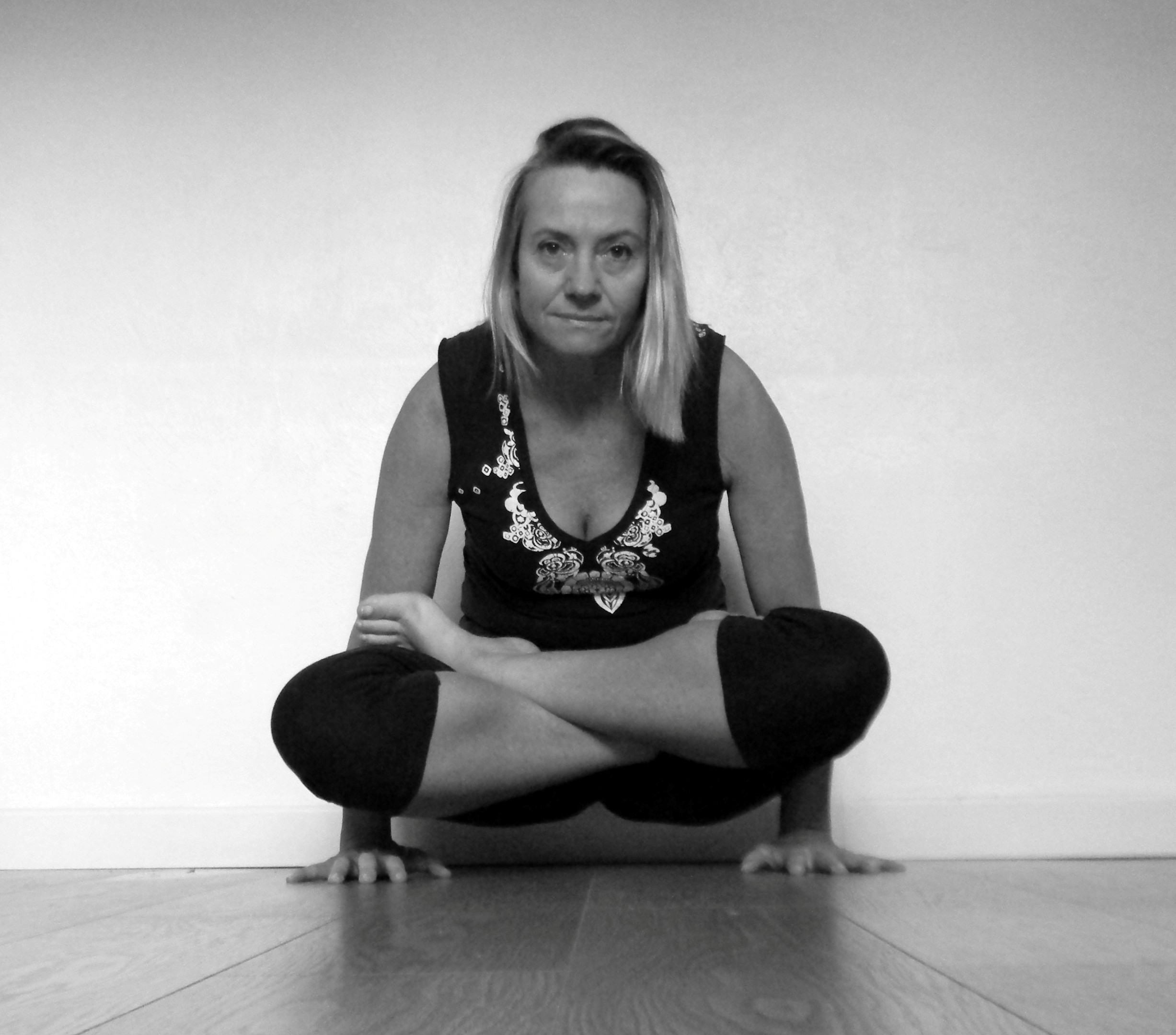
Tulasana

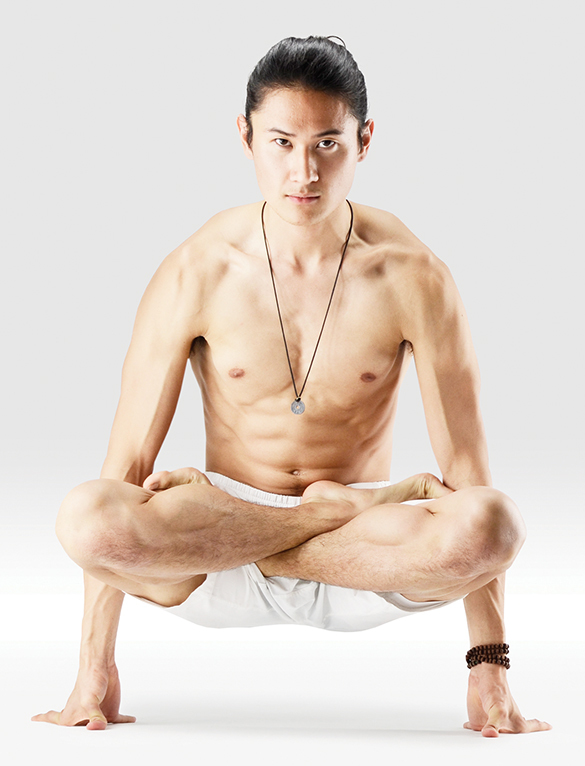
Tulasana with a variant hand position

== See also ==
- List of asanas
- Bakasana, a hand balancing pose with the legs resting on the arms

== Sources ==
- Iyengar, B. K. S. (1979) [1966]. Light on Yoga: Yoga Dipika. Thorsons. ISBN 978-1855381667.
- Mallinson, James; Singleton, Mark (2017). Roots of Yoga. Penguin Books. ISBN 978-0-241-25304-5.
- Sjoman, Norman E. (1999) [1996]. The Yoga Tradition of the Mysore Palace. Abhinav Publications. ISBN 81-7017-389-2.
