= Tittibhasana =

Hand-balancing posture in hatha yoga

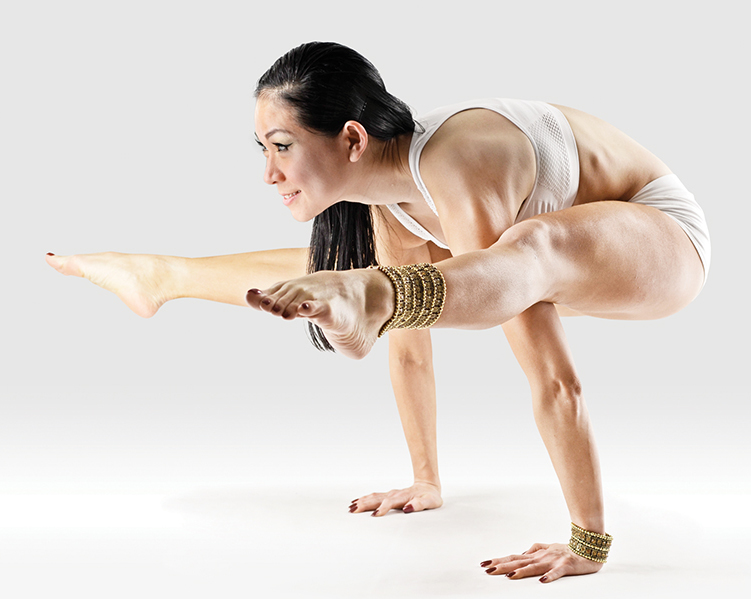
Firefly pose

Tittibhasana (Sanskrit: टिट्टिभासन, romanized: ṭiṭṭibhāsana) or Firefly pose is an arm-balancing asana with the legs stretched out forwards in hatha yoga and modern yoga as exercise. Variants include Bhujapidasana, with the legs crossed at the ankle, and Eka Hasta Bhujasana, with one leg stretched out forwards.

== Etymology and origins ==
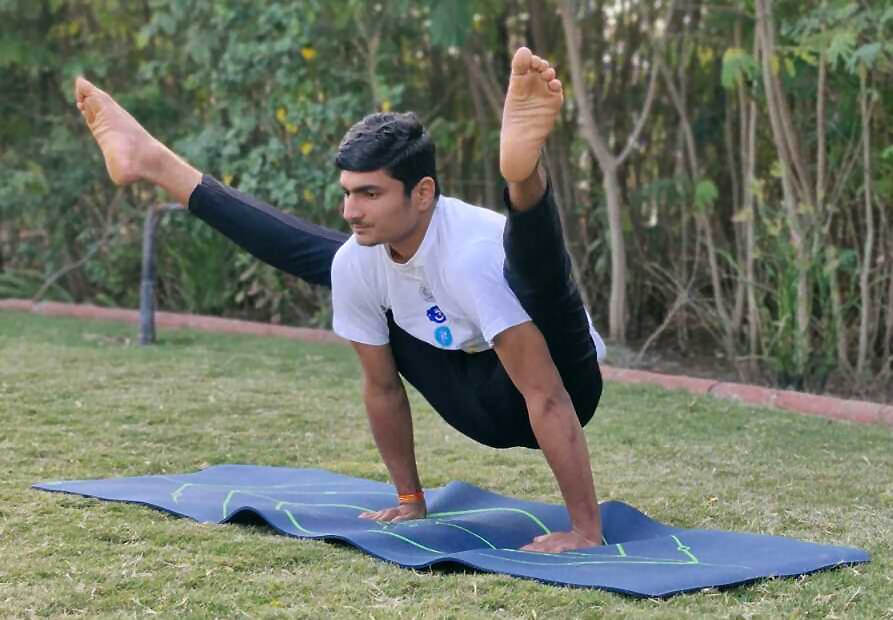
Tittibhasana, legs in high position

The name Tittibhasana comes from Sanskrit: Ṭiṭṭibha, "small insect, firefly", and āsana, "posture" or "seat". Indian folklore tells the story of a pair of Tittibha birds that nested by the sea; the ocean swept away their eggs, and the birds complained to Vishnu, asking for the eggs to be returned. The god gave the order, and the sea gave the eggs back. The effectiveness of the small weak birds is said to be used as a symbol of yoga, able to overcome the power of illusion in the world.

The name Bhujapidasana (Sanskrit: भुजपीडासन; IAST: Bhujapīḍāsana) comes from Bhuja (Sanskrit: भुज) meaning "arm" or "shoulder", and Pīḍa (Sanskrit: पीडा) meaning "pressure". The pose is described and illustrated in the 19th century Sritattvanidhi as Mālāsana, garland pose; however, that name is given to a different asana in Light on Yoga. The pose is described in the 20th century in Krishnamacharya's 1935 Yoga Makaranda; it was taken up by his pupils Pattabhi Jois in his ashtanga yoga, and by B. K. S. Iyengar in his Light on Yoga.

== Description ==
Tittibhasana is described in Light on Yoga as being entered from Dvi Pada Sirsasana, a difficult sitting pose with the legs crossed behind the head, that in Iyengar's words "requires practice", by uncrossing the ankles, stretching the legs straight up, and pushing down on the hands to balance. It is an intermediate level asana in Ashtanga (vinyasa) yoga.

== Variations ==
In ashtanga yoga, Tittibhasana B is an advanced standing pose with straight legs, the head between the knees, and the arms clasping behind the back. The practitioner then walks some steps forwards in this position, and some few steps back.

Bhujapidasana, Shoulder Pressing Pose, is similar, with the thighs resting on the upper arms, but the legs are crossed at the ankle in front of the body.

Eka Hasta Bhujasana, Elephant's Trunk Pose or One Leg Over Arm Balance, has one leg stretched out straight forwards between the supporting arms.

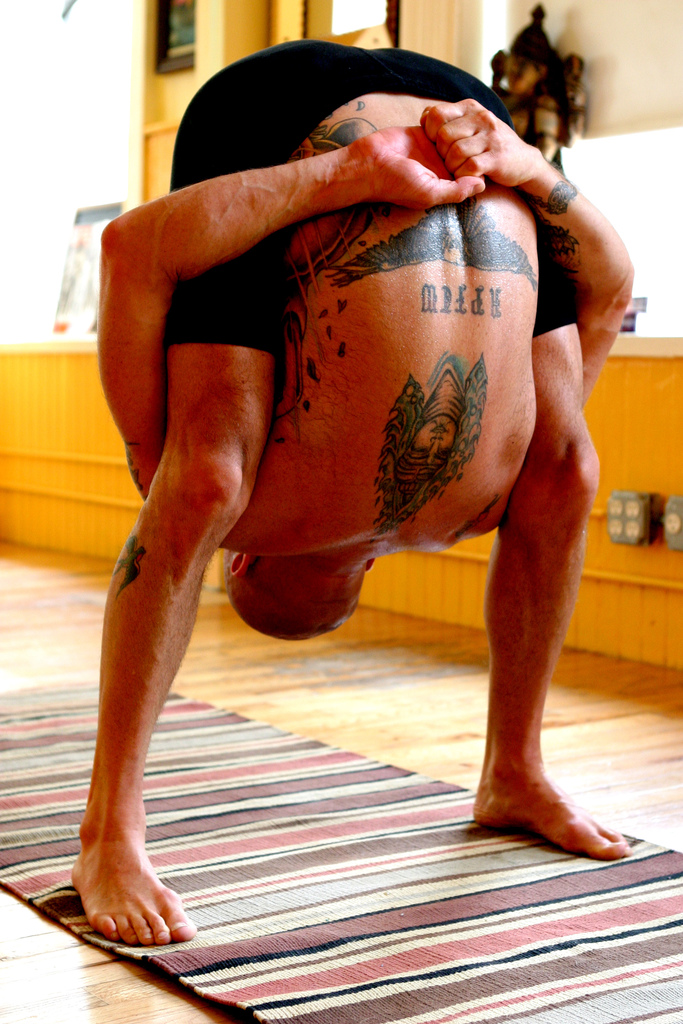
Tittibhasana B

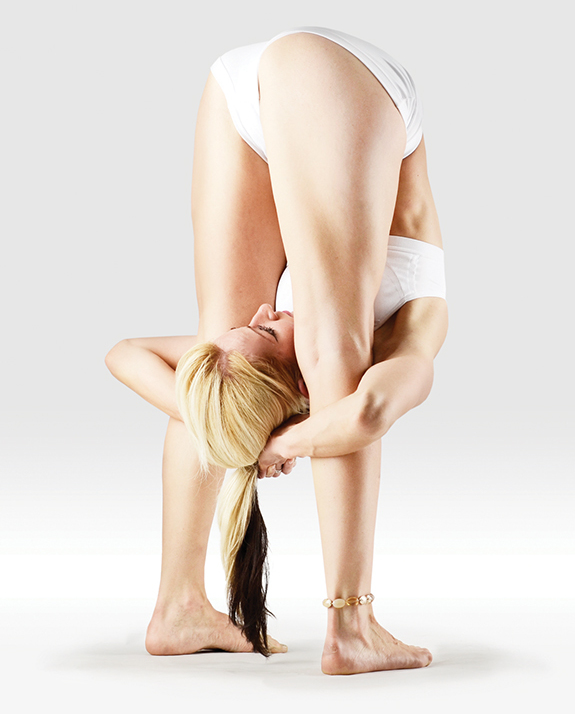
Standing Firefly Pose, a variant of Tittibhasana B

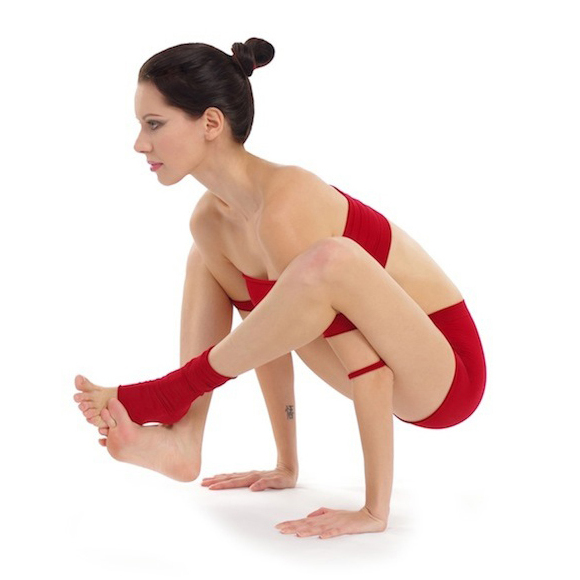
Bhujapidasana or Shoulder Pressing Pose

== See also ==
- Bakasana – a hand balancing pose, with the shins resting on the upper arms

== Sources ==
- "Tittibhasana [A]". Ashtanga Yoga.
- Bramadat, Paul (2025). Yogalands. Montreal: McGill–Queen's University Press. ISBN 978-0-2280-2374-6.
- Iyengar, B. K. S. (1979) [1966]. Light on Yoga: Yoga Dipika. Unwin Paperbacks. ISBN 978-1855381667.
- Sell, Christina (2019). "A Challenging Balance Pose: Tittibhasana (Firefly Pose)". Yoga International.
- Sjoman, Norman E. (1999). The Yoga Tradition of the Mysore Palace. Abhinav Publications. ISBN 81-7017-389-2.
- "Firefly Pose". Yoga Journal. 28 August 2007.
- "Shoulder-pressing posture". Yoga Journal. 7 May 2008.
- "Challenge Pose: Eka Hasta Bhujasana". Yoga Journal. 30 August 2010.
