= Malasana =

Various squatting asanas in hatha yoga and modern yoga as exercise

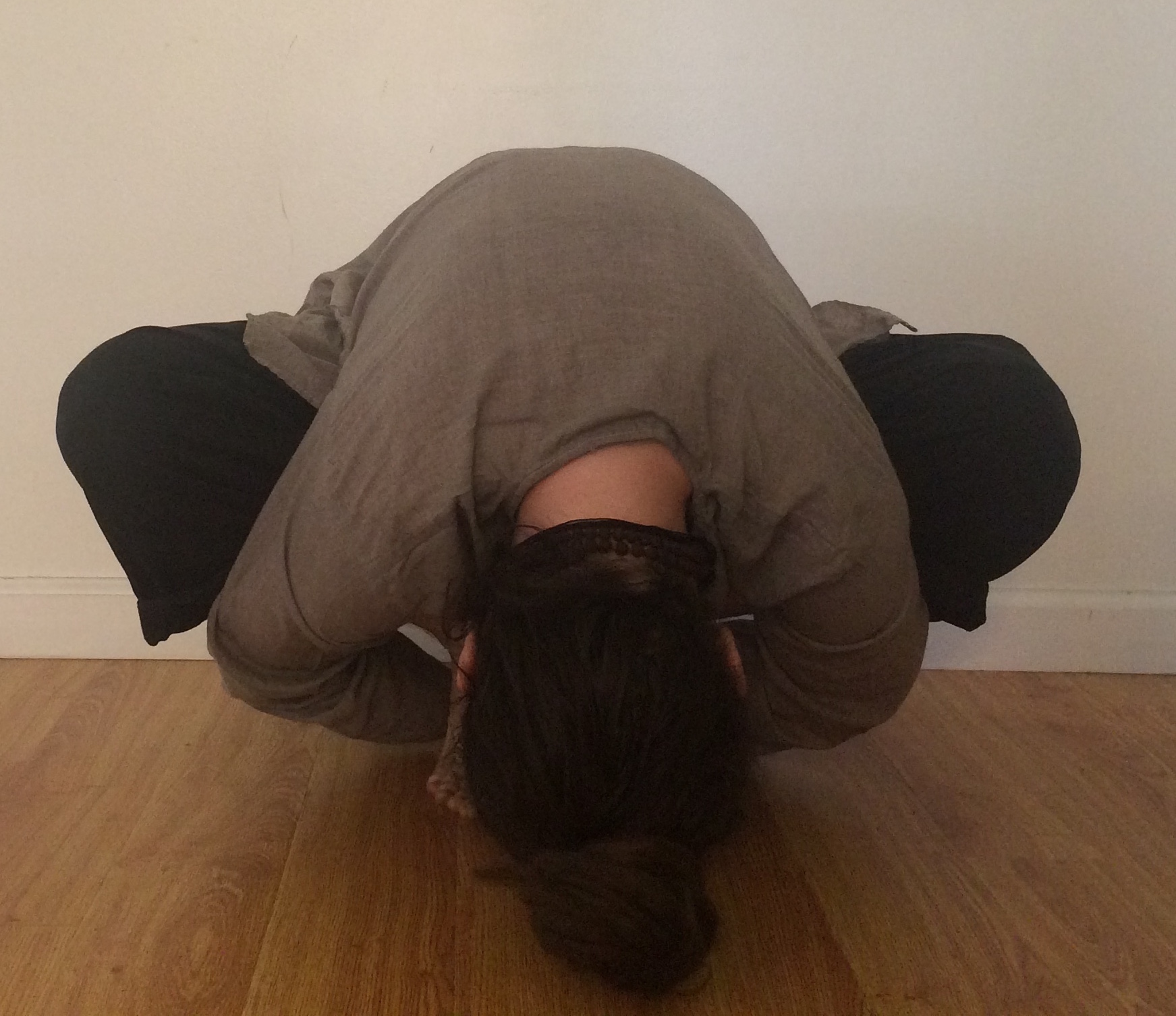
Malasana II from the front

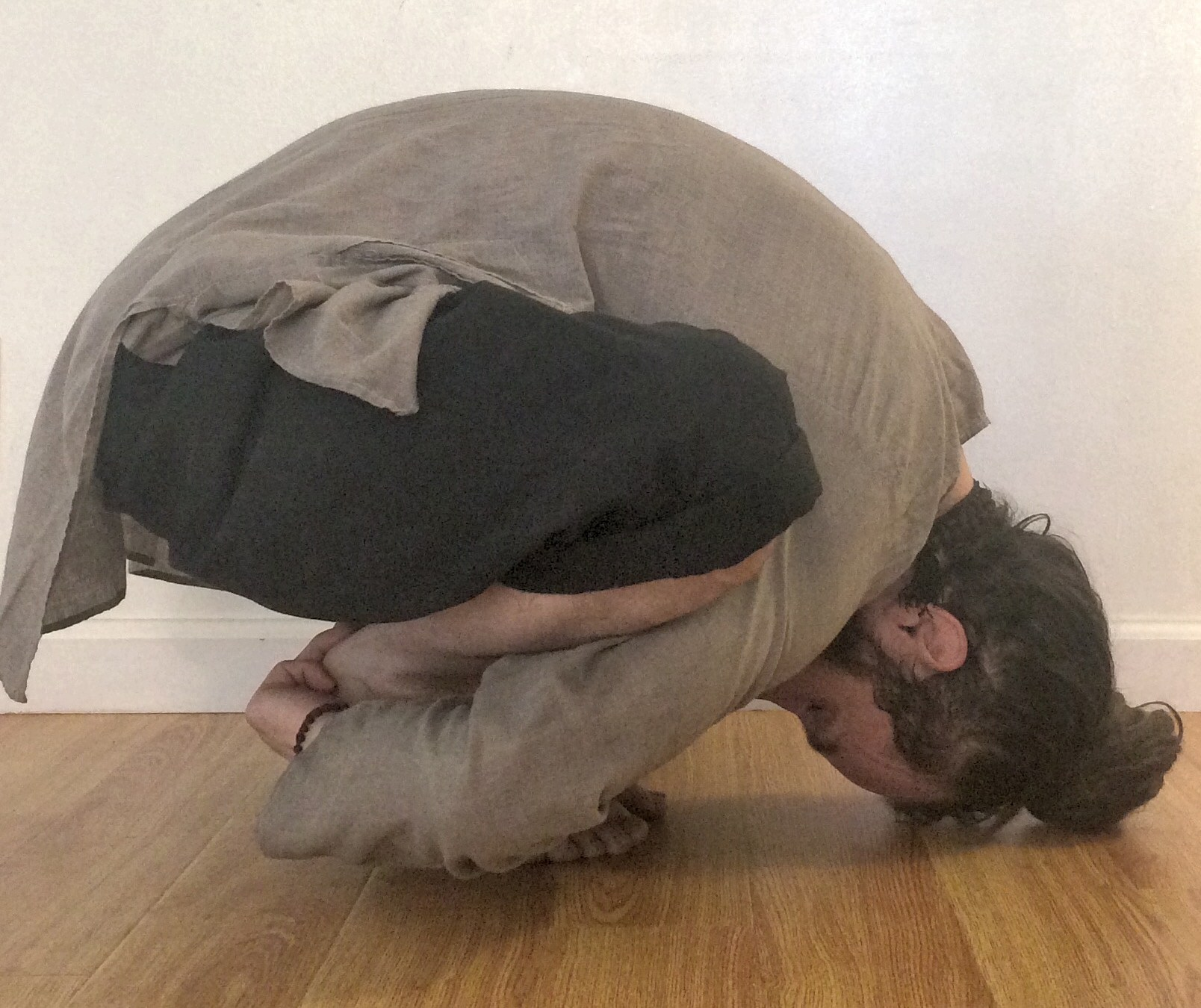
Malasana II from the side

The name Malasana is used for various squatting asanas in hatha yoga and modern yoga as exercise.

Traditionally, and in B. K. S. Iyengar's Light on Yoga, Malasana, or Garland Pose, is used for a squatting pose with the feet together and the back rounded with multiple hand placement variations. When the hands are bound around the back, forming the "garland", this pose is sometimes called Kanchyasana ("golden belt pose").

In the West, the name Malasana is also used for the regular squat pose, Upaveshasana, in which the hand palms are folded together in Anjali Mudra in front of the chest, and the feet are set wider apart.

== Etymology ==
The name Malasana is from the Sanskrit माला mālā, a garland, necklace, or rosary; and आसन āsana, "seat" or "posture". According to Iyengar, the name derives from the arms "hanging from the neck like a garland". Under the name Malasana, the 19th-century Sritattvanidhi illustrates what is now called Bhujapidasana (the shoulder press), a pose in which the body is completely supported on the hands. (Note: In this position, the arms are indeed "hanging from the neck like a garland," in contrast to Iyengar's squatting Malasana and Upavesasana.)

== Description and variants ==
The name malasana is used for the following asanas:

=== Upaveshasana ===
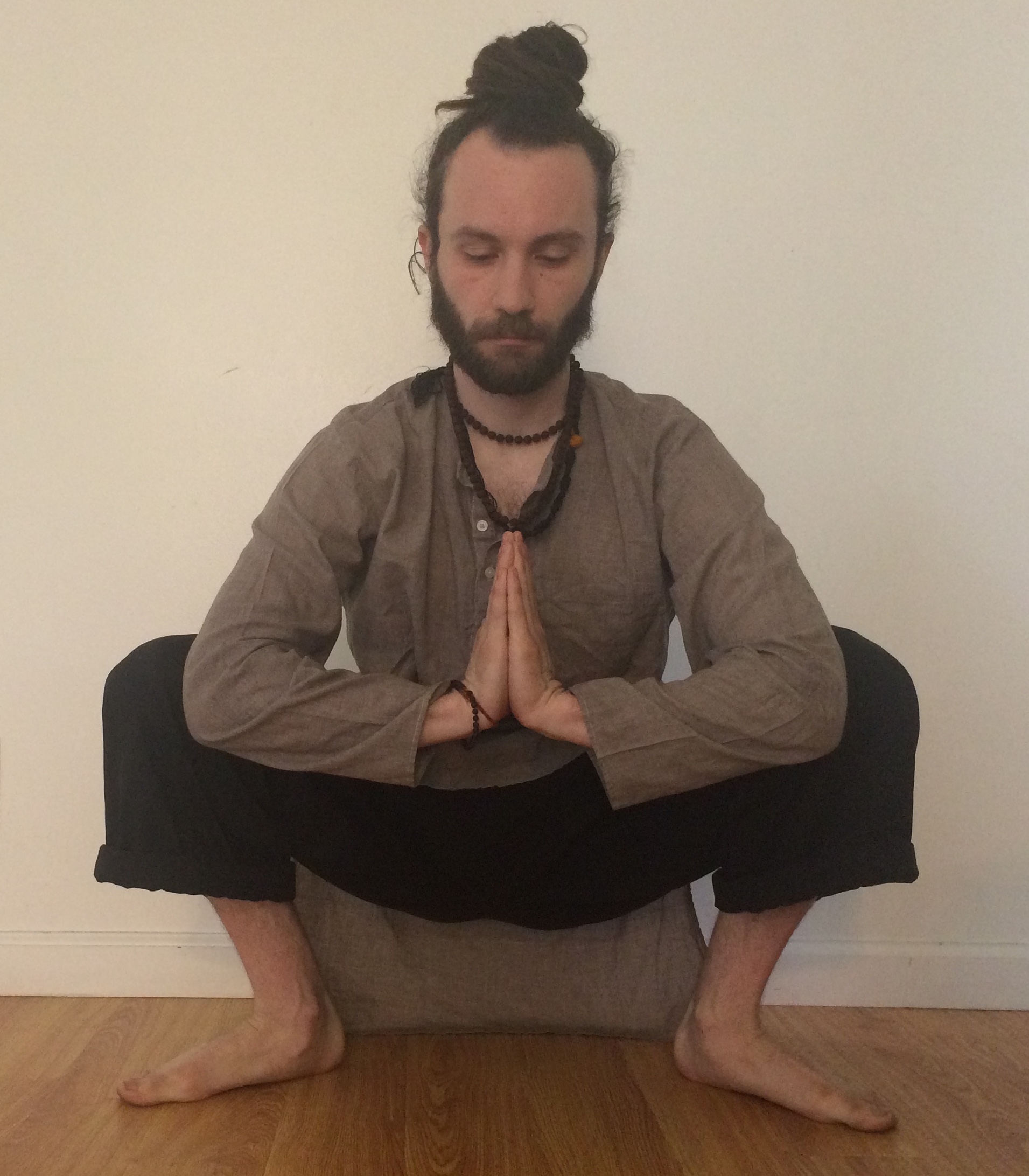
Upaveshasana

The name Malasana is sometimes used in the West for the regular squat pose, Upaveshasana (IAST:Upaveśāsana), in which the palms of the hands are folded together in Anjali Mudra (prayer posture) in front of the chest, and the feet are set apart. Yoga Journal states that Malasana stretches the ankles, groins and back, and tones the belly, but cautions about using the asana when there are lower back or knee injuries. A variant of this pose, Prapadasana, has the heels together and the feet on tiptoe.

=== Malasana I/Kanchyasana ===
In the first variant, also called Kanchyasana ("golden belt pose"), the feet are together with the arms wrapped around the back, while the chin touches the floor.

=== Malasana II ===
In the second variant, the hands wrap around the heels, and the chin touches the floor. (Note: Iyengar mentions this as variant II.)

== See also ==
- List of asanas

== Sources ==
- Iyengar, B. K. S. (1979). Light on Yoga. Unwin Paperbacks.
- Kaminoff, Leslie; Kaminoff, Matthew (2013). Yoga-Anatomie: Ihr Begleiter durch die Asanas, Bewegungen und Atemtechniken. Riva Verlag.
- Ramaswami, Srivatsa; Krishnamacharya, T. (2005). The complete book of vinyasa yoga: an authoritative presentation, based on 30 years of direct study under the legendary yoga teacher Krishnamacharya. Da Capo Press. ISBN 978-1-56924-402-9.
- Sjoman, Norman E. (1999) [1996]. The Yoga Tradition of the Mysore Palace. Abhinav Publications. ISBN 978-81-7017-389-2.
