= The Yoga Tradition of the Mysore Palace =

Non-fiction book about origins of modern yoga

- On the book's cover, a man performs Natarajasana in front of a temple
- Author: Norman Sjoman
- Subject: yoga
- Publisher: Abhinav Publications
- Publication date: 1996
- Pages: 124

The Yoga Tradition of the Mysore Palace is a 1996 non-fiction book by the independent scholar Norman Sjoman about the origins of modern yoga. It is based on his study of the Sritattvanidhi, a 19th-century nine-volume compendium created for the then Maharaja of Mysore sometime between 1811 and 1868. The ninth volume, Kautuka nidhi, describes and illustrates 122 asanas performed as a physical activity.

The book was broadly welcomed by scholars as opening up the study of the origins of modern yoga other than in ancient texts. In particular, Joseph Alter went on to investigate some of the early practices of modern yoga and its connections with Hindu nationalism, while Mark Singleton built on Sjoman's work to investigate the origins of yoga as exercise in European physical culture.

== Context ==
In the mid-1980s, while doing research at the Mysore Palace in Karnataka, Norman Sjoman made copies of the yoga section (9, Kautuka nidhi) of the Sritattvanidhi, an illustrated compendium, authored in the 19th century sometime between 1811 and 1868 in Karnataka by the then Maharaja. The book included diagrams of 122 yoga asanas. Unlike the few other known historical yoga treatises, the emphasis was solely on the physical activity. Some appeared based on Indian wrestling and other gymnastic exercises, in that aspect more closely resembling modern yoga as exercise forms such as Ashtanga (vinyasa) yoga. Both B. K. S. Iyengar and Pattabhi Jois, who are major influences on modern yoga forms, studied under teacher Tirumalai Krishnamacharya at the Mysore Palace in the 1930s. Sjoman further researched Krishnamacharya, finding several writings in the palace library. He discovered that the royal family, in the early 1900s, had employed a British gymnast to train the young princes. So, when Krishnamacharya arrived in the 1920s to start a yoga school, his schoolroom was the former gymnasium complete with ropes. Sjoman argues that several exercises detailed in a gymnastics manual were incorporated into Krishnamacharya's syllabus, resulting in his energetic vinyasa style of yoga, and further passed on to Iyengar and Jois.

The Yoga Tradition of the Mysore Palace was published by Abhinav Publications in 1996 including 122 asana illustrations. The book has 124 pages.

== Content ==
=== Main text ===
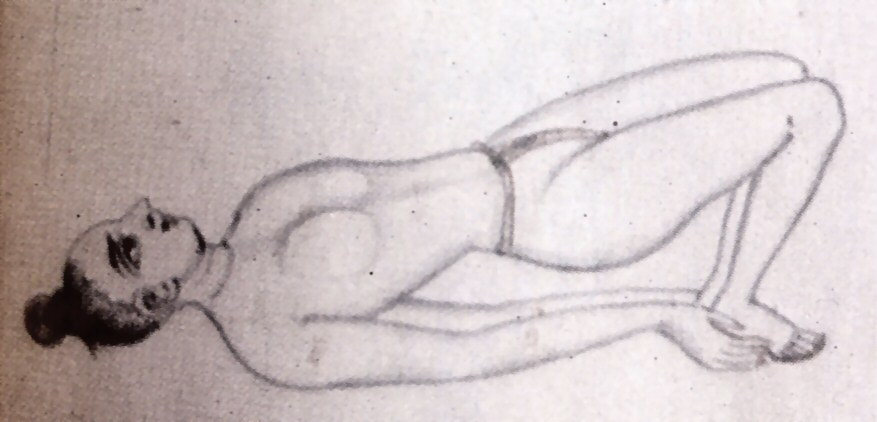
Sjoman discovered the illustrations of yoga asanas, such as Setubandhasana, in the 19th century Sritattvanidhi in the Mysore Palace.

The book begins with a section of colour plates reproducing all 122 asana illustrations in the Sritattvanidhi.

The main part of the book is Norman Sjoman's introduction to the Sritattvanidhi. He explains the Mysore Palace's tradition of yoga, setting it in its Indian context. He states that the tradition from Patanjali's 2nd-century Yoga Sutras is dead, followed by an "equally enigmatic" tradition of medieval hatha yoga. He describes modern yoga as exercise, noting that the tradition goes back to two influential founders of schools of yoga, B. K. S. Iyengar (especially via his 1966 Light on Yoga) and Pattabhi Jois, and to their teacher Tirumalai Krishnamacharya, but no further.

Sjoman notes the Indian tradition of exercise, and that the Mysore Palace had its own exercise manual, the Vyayama Dipika, combining British and Indian traditions, and a gymnasium for such exercise. He states that Krishnamacharya was apparently given the gymnasium to use as his yoga hall; and that some of the asanas resemble those in the exercise manual.

He describes the Sritattvanidhi as somewhat confused, dividing the asanas into odd groups and seemingly mixing up some names, along with other errors. These imply, he writes, that the scribe was not familiar with asana practice, but that there was a heritage of asanas including others not listed in the book. In addition, some of the asanas use ropes, suggesting an origin in India's Mallakhamba wrestling exercises using a pole, and sometimes a rope.

The body of the book concludes with a translation of the Sritattvanidhi text.

=== Appendices ===
The Mysore Palace as it was in the 19th century when the Maharajah of Mysore had the Sritattvanidhi written

An appendix lists the names of the 122 asanas in the Sritattvanidhi.

Five appendices provide for comparison lists of the asanas (yoga postures) from: four medieval hatha yoga texts: Hatha Yoga Pradipika, Gheranda Samhita, Shiva Samhita, and Goraksha Samhita (Sjoman notes that other texts he examined did not contain asanas); Vishnudevananda's 1960 The Complete Illustrated Book of Yoga; Yogeshwarananda's 1970 First Steps to Higher Yoga; Pattabhi Jois's Ashtanga (vinyasa) yoga asanas, grouped by Jois's practice series (from 1948 onwards); and Tirumalai Krishnamacharya's 1934 Yoga Makaranda asanas.

An appendix provides a description by T.V. Venkatacala Sastri of the Maisuru Maisiri, a modern text in old Kannada, describing a yoga session in the Mysore Palace.

Two more appendices offer photographs of Asana-like postures in the Vyayama Dipika ("Light on Exercise"), a "western gymnastics manual written by the Mysore Palace gymnasts". These include poses like Urdhva Dhanurasana, Astavakrasana, Kakasana, Lolasana, and Mayurasana; and of Krishnamacharya teaching boys in the Mysore Palace, and the yogaśala there, formerly the gymnastics hall, complete with ropes, from his Yoga Makaranda.

== Reception ==
The anthropologist Joseph Alter wrote in his 2004 book Yoga in Modern India that the radical, perhaps heretical, idea that some of the practice of modern yoga as exercise is based on something as mundane as British gymnastics caused a stir in the yoga world. He added that Sjoman's work was important in signalling the need for research on texts from the start of modern yoga, rather than from more ancient texts.

The yoga scholar Mark Singleton, following up on Sjoman's work in his 2010 book Yoga Body: The Origins of Modern Posture Practice, calls Sjoman's analysis insightful, and "among the first studies" of the history of modern yoga, though without emphasising influence from physical culture. Singleton notes that there are few standing asanas until the modern period, and that Yogendra and Kuvalayananda transformed a largely spiritual practice into something therapeutic. He takes up Sjoman's identification of "late" asanas – those created in the 20th century, presumably by Krishnamacharya – as those with "functional/descriptive" names (like Parshvakonasana, "Side Angle Pose"), distinguishing them from earlier names from "symbolic objects, animals, sages, and deities" (like Kukkutasana, "Cockerel Pose"). Singleton compares these newer asanas to poses in Niels Bukh's Primary Gymnastics, suggesting that Krishnamacharya may have been influenced by western physical culture.

Anna L. Dallapiccola, reviewing the book for the Journal of the Royal Asiatic Society, notes that "there is ample material for a history of yoga" and Sjoman's description of it as a "living tradition", especially in Mysore where "yoga has been continuously patronised by the ruling family for over two centuries".

The yoga scholars Jason Birch and Jacqueline Hargreaves endorse Sjoman's proposal that the rope poses, which they identify as coming from the Haṭhābhyāsapaddhati, could either have been from mallakhamba or from military training "of scaling walls with ropes and ladders".

Pattabhi Jois, when asked what he thought of this book, told one of his students that Norman Sjoman had written it just to make money off of him.

== Sources ==
- Sjoman, Norman E. (1999) [1996]. The Yoga Tradition of the Mysore Palace (2nd ed.). New Delhi, India: Abhinav Publications. ISBN 81-7017-389-2.
