= Koundinyasana =

Asymmetric balancing posture in yoga as exercise

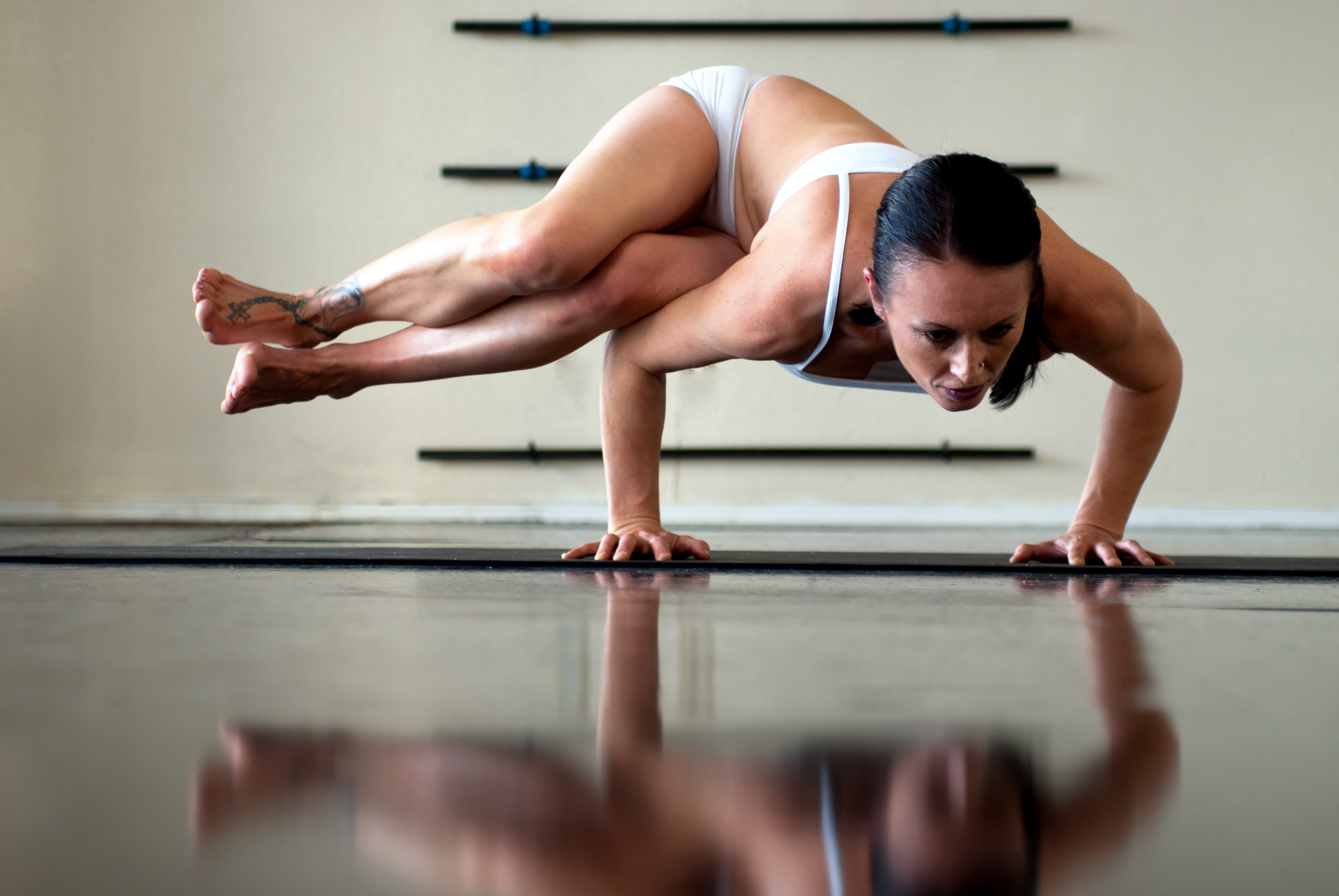
Dvi Pada Koundinyasana

Koundinyasana (Sanskrit: कौण्डिन्यासन, IAST: kauṇḍinyāsana), or Sage Kaundinya's pose, is a hand-balancing asana in modern yoga as exercise. It may be performed with both legs bent (Dvi Pada Koundinyasana), or with one leg over the supporting arm, the other leg straight (Eka Pada Koundinyasana). Eka Pada Galavasana (Flying Pigeon Pose) has one leg bent, the foot hooked over the opposite arm under the body.

== Etymology and origins ==
The pose is named after Kaundinya (Sanskrit: कौण्डिन्य), an Indian sage, and āsana (Sanskrit: आसन) meaning "posture" or "seat". The variations for one and two legs include the Sanskrit words for one (ek) or two (dvi), and pada (Sanskrit: पद) meaning "foot".

The pose is not described in medieval hatha yoga. It appears in the 20th century among the asanas described by B. K. S. Iyengar in his 1966 book Light on Yoga, and those taught by Pattabhi Jois in Mysore in his Ashtanga Vinyasa Yoga. Both Iyengar and Jois were pupils of Krishnamacharya.

== Description ==
Koundinyasana is traditionally entered from tripod headstand, a variant of Sirsasana, but one can also get into the asana from Parsva Bakasana. The knee needs to be far enough up the triceps of the opposite arm before bending the elbows to engage the core muscles and help to prevent the leg from sliding down.

== Variations ==
Eka Pada Koundinyasana has one leg stretched out straight in line with the body.

Eka Pada Galavasana (Flying Pigeon Pose) has one leg bent, the foot hooked over the opposite arm under the body. The full pose, Galavasana, has the legs crossed in Padmasana, one knee tucked between the arms.

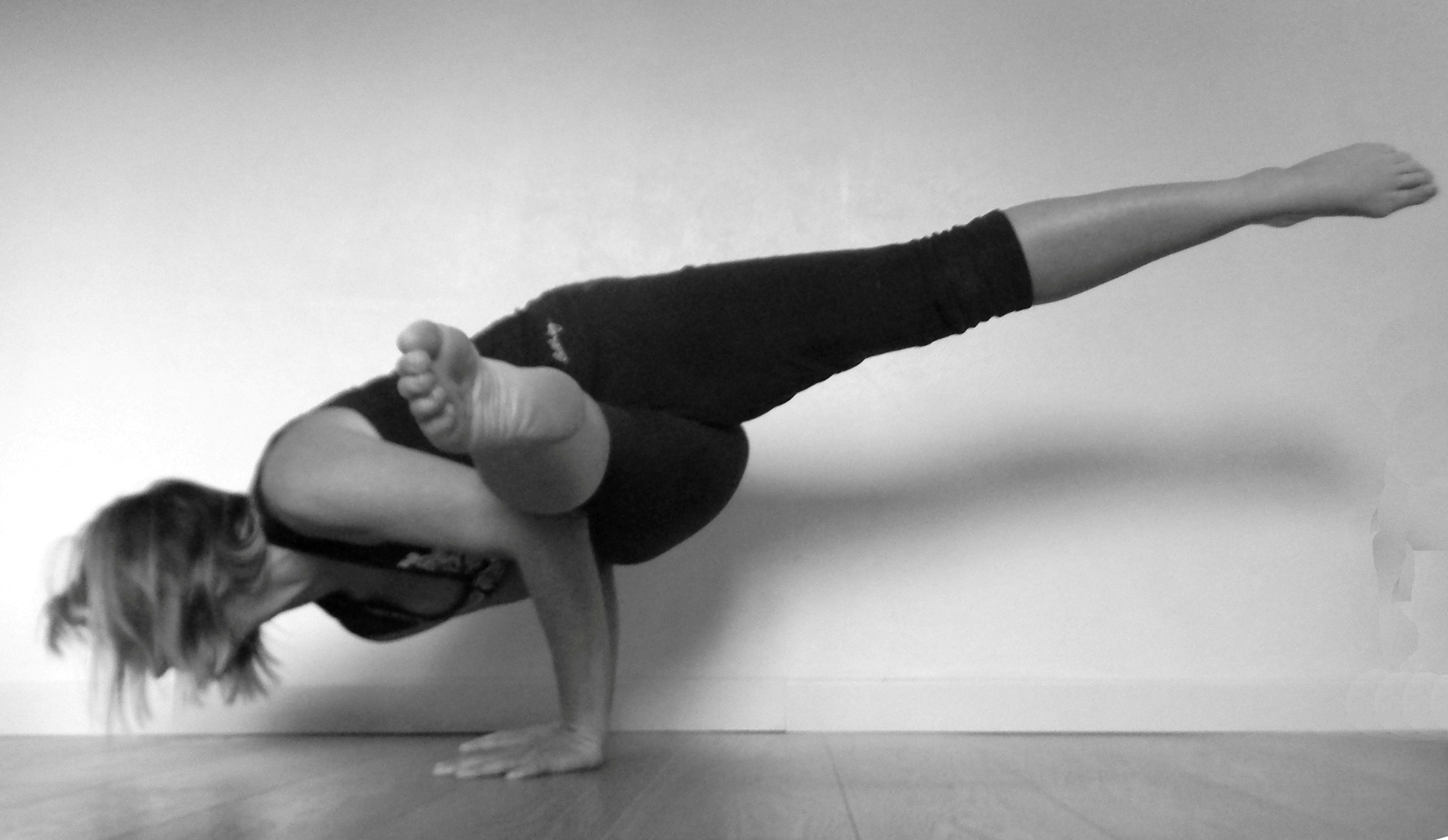
Eka Pada Koundinyasana I
(lower leg on arm)

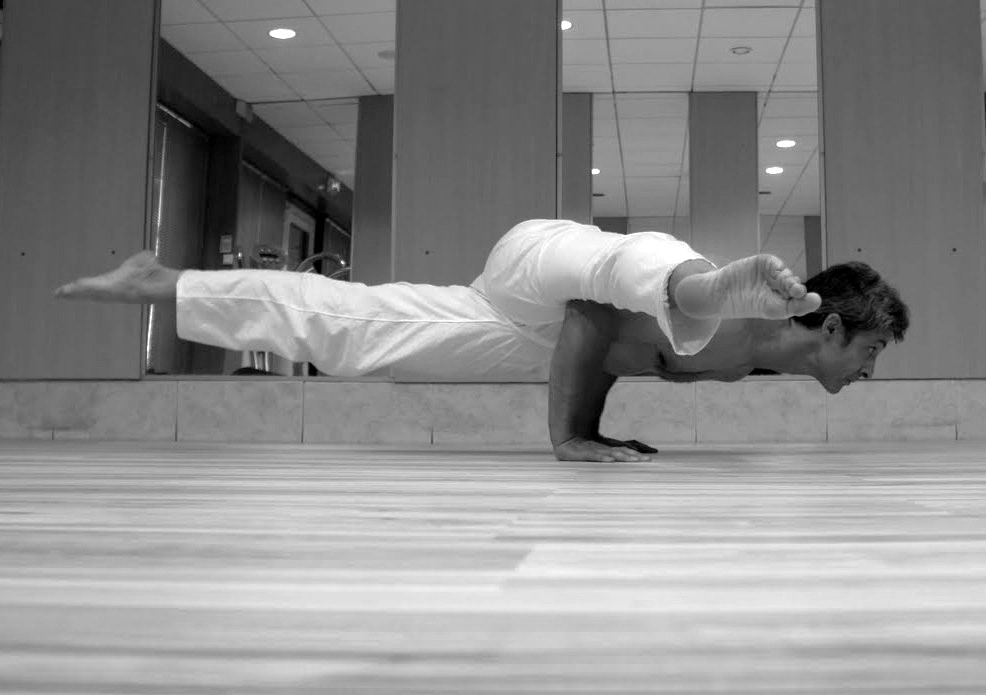
Eka Pada Koundinyasana II
(upper leg on arm)

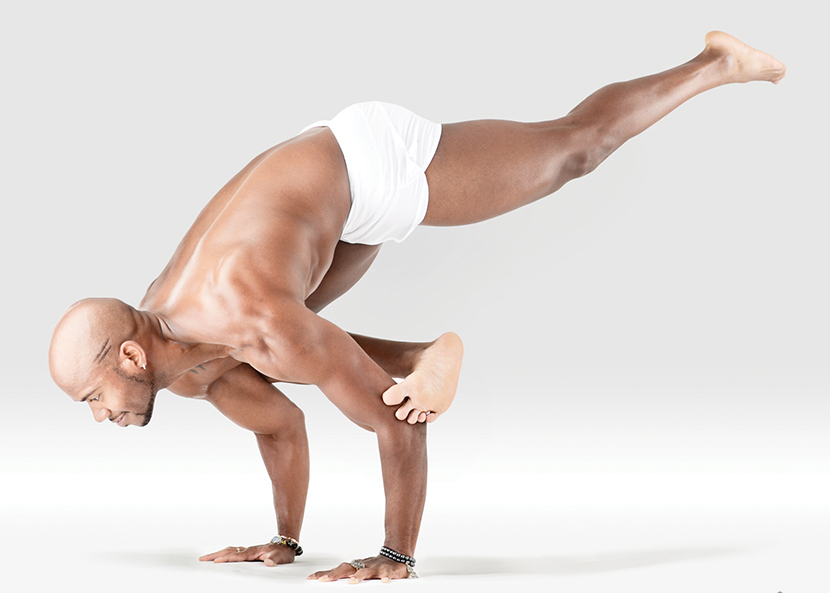
Eka Pada Galavasana (foot hooked over elbow)

== See also ==
- Astavakrasana, a similar twisting arm-balancing asana
- List of asanas

== Sources ==
- Iyengar, B. K. S. (1979) [1966]. Light on Yoga: Yoga Dipika. Unwin Paperbacks. ISBN 978-1855381667.
