= Setu Bandha Sarvangasana =

Inverted back-bending posture in hatha yoga

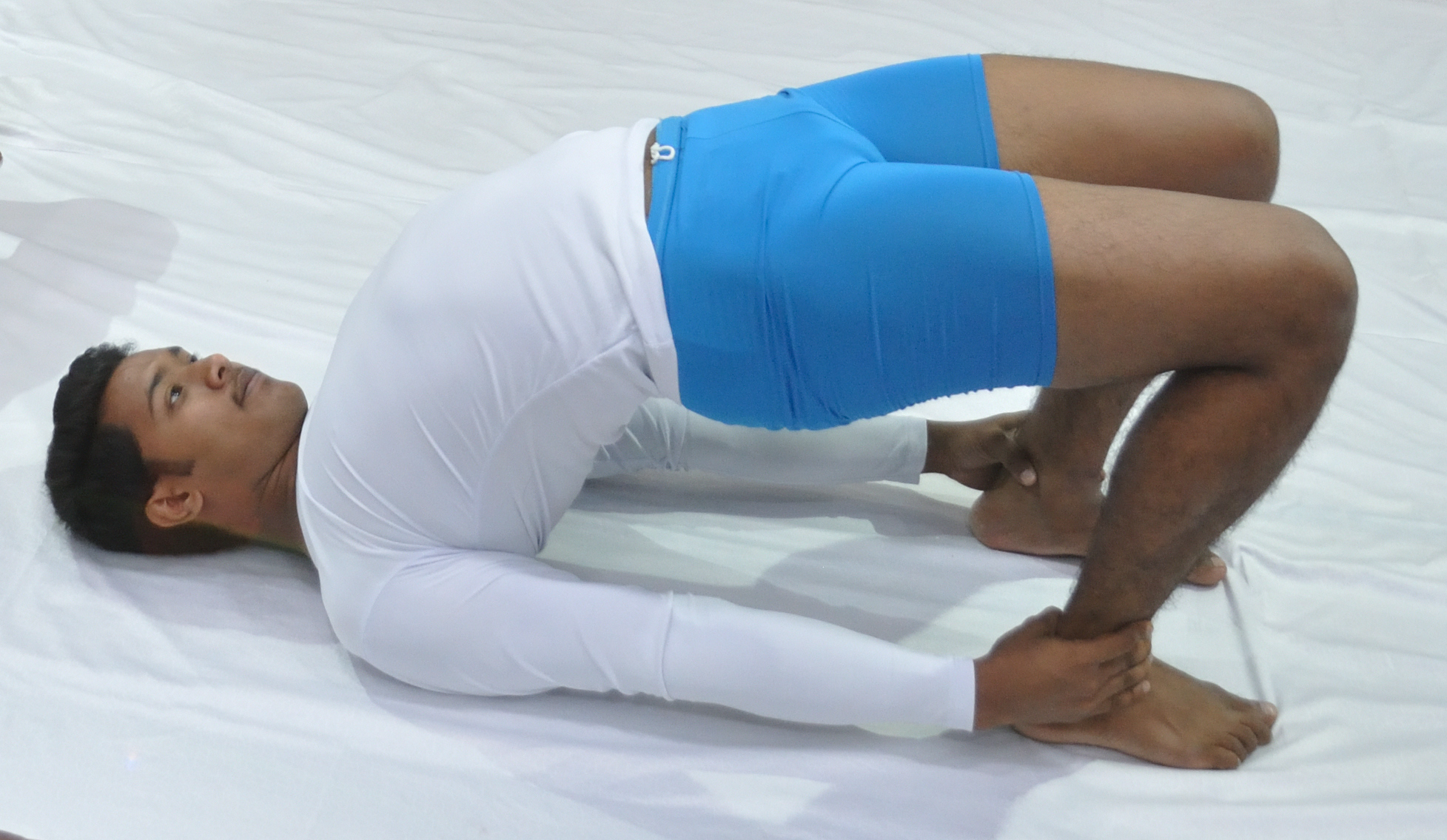
Setubandhasana, full pose with the ankles caught by the hands

Setu Bandha Sarvāṅgāsana (Sanskrit: सेतु बन्ध सर्वाङ्गासन), Shoulder supported bridge or simply Bridge, also called Setu Bandhāsana, is an inverted back-bending asana in hatha yoga and modern yoga as exercise.

== Etymology and origins ==
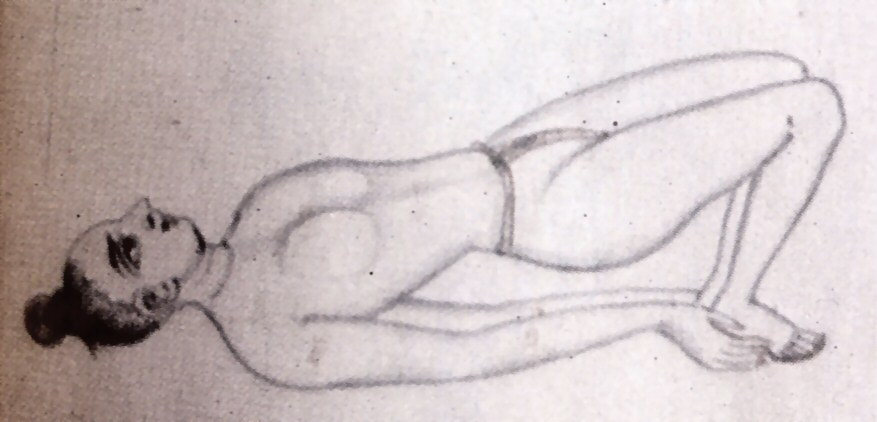
"Kāmapīṭhāsana" from Sritattvanidhi. 19th century

The pose is named from the Sanskrit words सेतु Setu, a bridge; बन्ध Bandha, caught; सर्वा Sarva, all; ङ्ग Anga, limb; and आसन Asana, seat or posture.

The pose appears as "Kāmapīṭhāsana" in the 19th century Sritattvanidhi (written before 1868).

== Description ==
The pose is entered from Sarvangasana (shoulderstand), the chest being held forwards by the hands and the feet lowered to the ground behind the back, the knees remaining bent; or more easily, by lifting the back from lying supine on the ground. The full pose has the knees bent and the ankles caught (Bandha) by the hands. The pose may be exited either by lying down or by jumping back up into shoulderstand.

== Variations ==
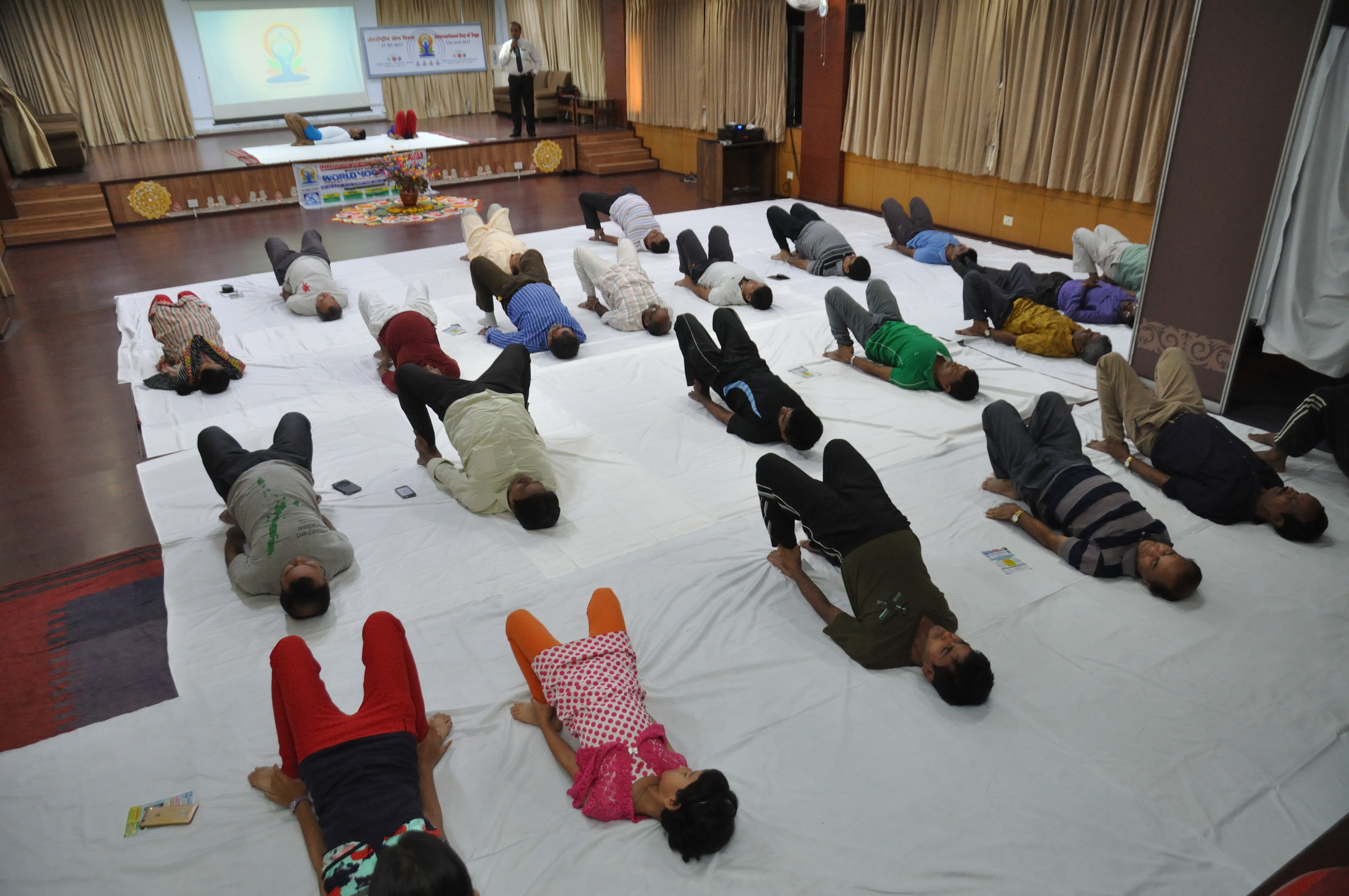
Setubandhasana, Kolkata, 2017

A common form of the pose has the arms straight out along the ground towards the feet, the arms straight with the fingers interlocked. Some practitioners are able to straighten the legs in the pose.

Eka Pada Setu Bandha Sarvangasana (One-legged Bridge) has one leg raised vertically.

== See also ==
- Chakrasana, Wheel Pose or Upward-facing Bow
- List of asanas

== Sources ==
- Iyengar, B. K. S. (1979) [1966]. Light on Yoga: Yoga Dipika. Unwin Paperbacks.
- Lidell, Lucy, The Sivananda Yoga Centre (1983). The book of yoga. Ebury. ISBN 978-0-85223-297-2. OCLC 12457963.
- Mehta, Silva; Mehta, Mira; Mehta, Shyam (1990). Yoga: The Iyengar Way. Dorling-Kindersley.
