= Bakasana =

Hand-balancing yoga posture

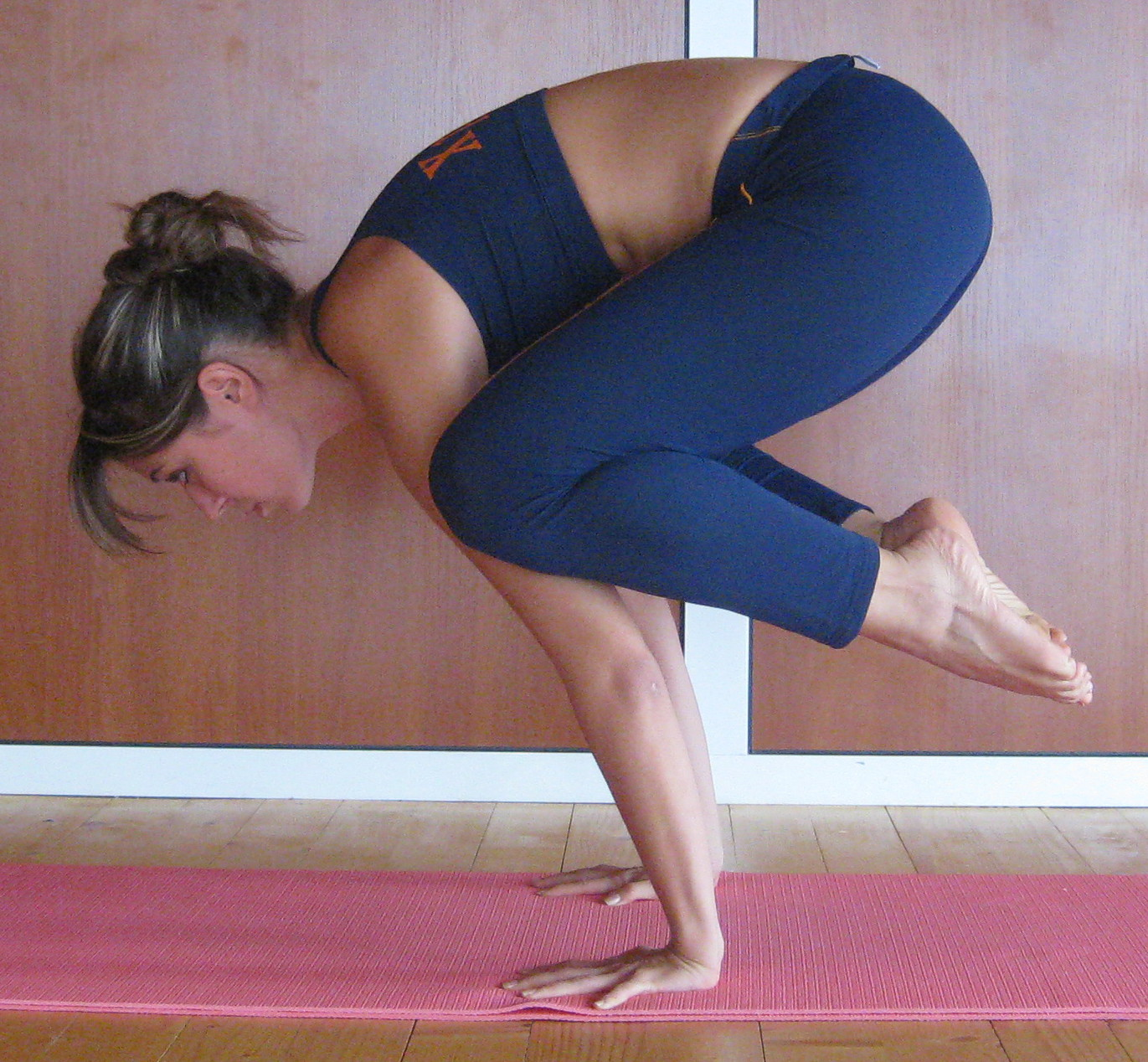
Bakasana, Crane pose, balancing with straight arms

Bakasana (Crane pose) (Sanskrit: बकासन, IAST: bakāsana), and the similar Kakasana (Crow pose) (Sanskrit: काकासन, IAST: kākasana) are balancing asanas in hatha yoga and modern yoga as exercise. In all variations, these are arm balancing poses in which hands are planted on the floor, shins rest upon upper arms, and feet lift up. The poses are often confused, but traditionally Kakasana has arms bent, Bakasana (the crane being the taller bird with longer legs) has the arms straight.

== Etymology and origins ==
The names for the asanas come from the Sanskrit words बक baka ("crane") or काक kāka (Note: The name is onomatopoeic for the crow's call.) ("crow"), and आसन āsana meaning "posture". While different yoga lineages use one name or another for the asanas, Dharma Mittra makes a distinction, citing Kakasana as being with arms bent (like the shorter legs of a crow) and Bakasana with arms straight (like the longer legs of a crane). B. K. S. Iyengar's 1966 Light on Yoga describes only Bakasana, with straight arms. In Sivananda Yoga, Swami Vishnudevananda's 1960 Complete Illustrated Book of Yoga describes only Kakasana, with bent arms. However, practitioners in the west often mistranslate the Sanskrit "Bakasana" as "Crow Pose". (Note: In his 1969 book Asana Pranayama Mudra Bandha, Swami Satyananda Saraswati of the Bihar School of Yoga uses the name Bakasana for a standing forward bend on one leg, the hands grasping the standing foot's toes, the other leg raised in line with the body.)

These balancing poses can be dated at least to the 17th century Hatha Ratnavali, where Bakasana is number 62 of the 84 poses said to have been taught by Shiva. The 19th century Sritattvanidhi, created for a Raja of Mysore, describes and illustrates both Kakasana and Bakasana. Norman Sjoman suggests that Krishnamacharya, teaching in the Mysore Palace, may have derived asanas including these from the 1896 Vyāyāma Dīpikā exercise manual.

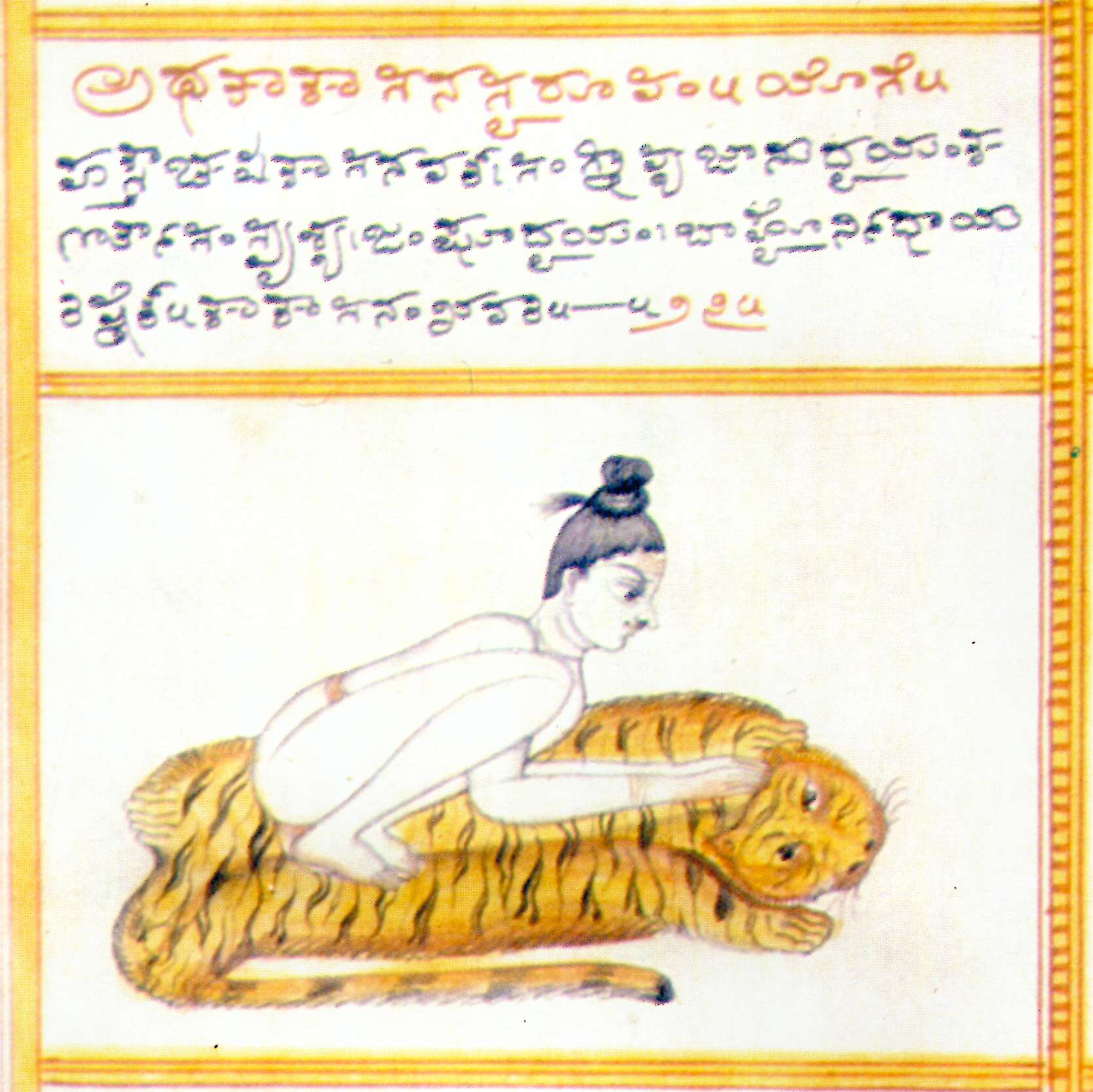
Kakasana, Crow Pose, in the 19th century Sritattvanidhi manuscript in the Mysore Palace

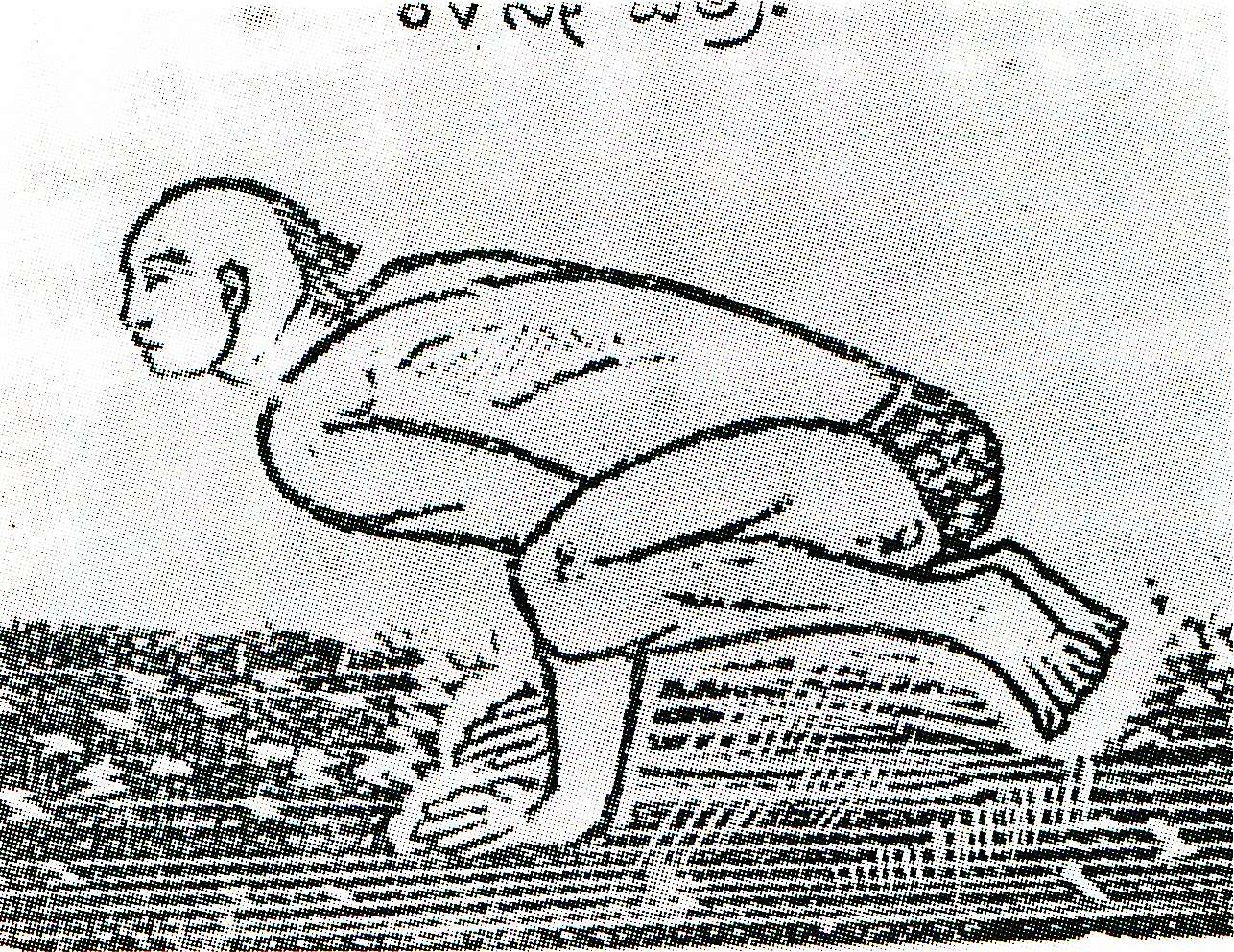
Engraving of "Bakasana" in the 1896 Vyāyāma Dīpikā (Light on Exercise)

== Description ==
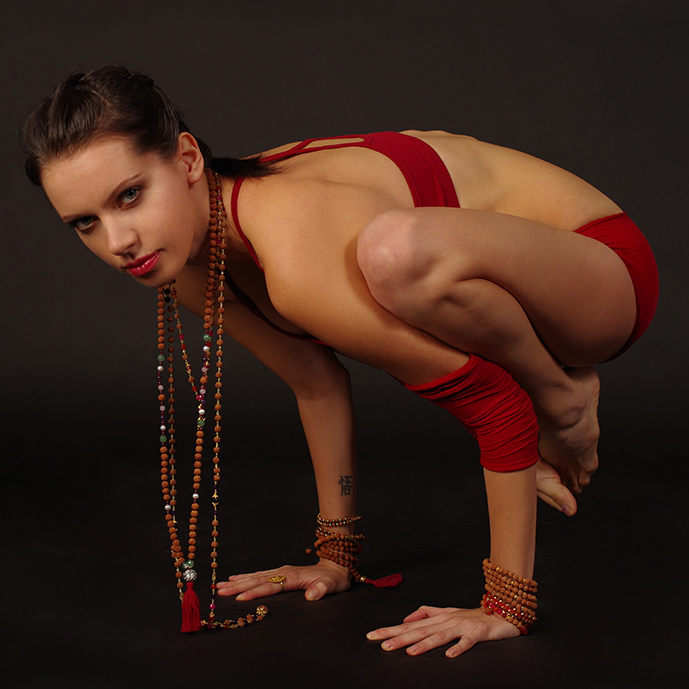
Kakasana, Crow Pose, with bent arms

These asanas are arm balances. In Crow Pose, the knees rest on the bent elbows. In Crane Pose, the elbows are straight and the knees are just above the shoulders, requiring flexibility in the hips. According to B.K.S. Iyengar there are two techniques for entering the poses. The simple method is by pushing up from a crouching position. The advanced method is to drop down from Shirshasana (yoga headstand) Some vinyasa yoga practitioners jump in and out of Crane/Crow via Downward Dog Pose. This can be practised in stages.

=== Variations ===
Asymmetric variations include:

- Parshva Bakasana (Side Crane Pose) in which one thigh rests on the opposite upper arm and the other leg is stacked on top of the first.
- Eka Pada Bakasana/Kakasana (One-Legged Crane/Crow Pose respectively) in which one leg remains in Bakasana while the other extends straight back.
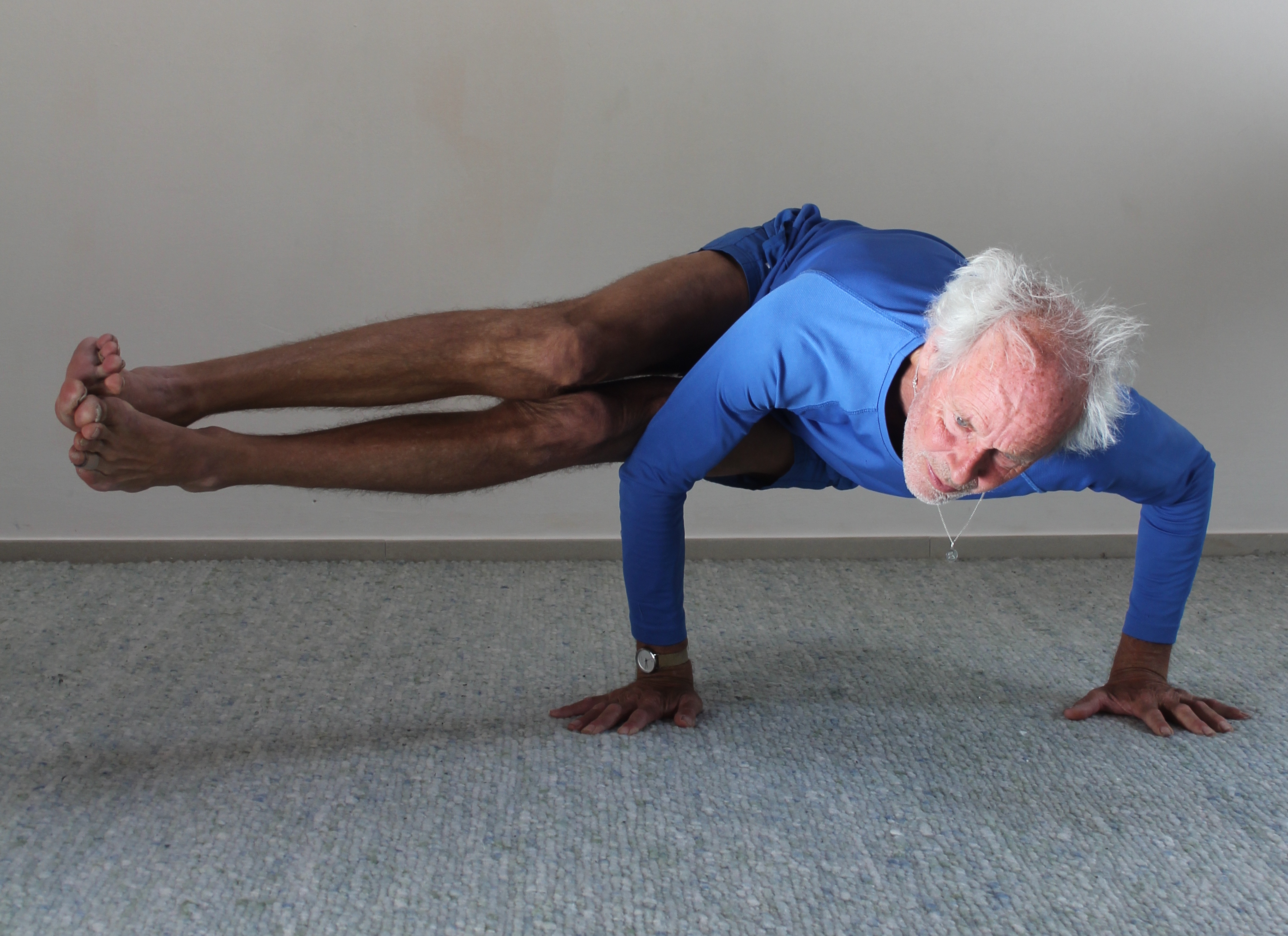
Parshva Bakasana

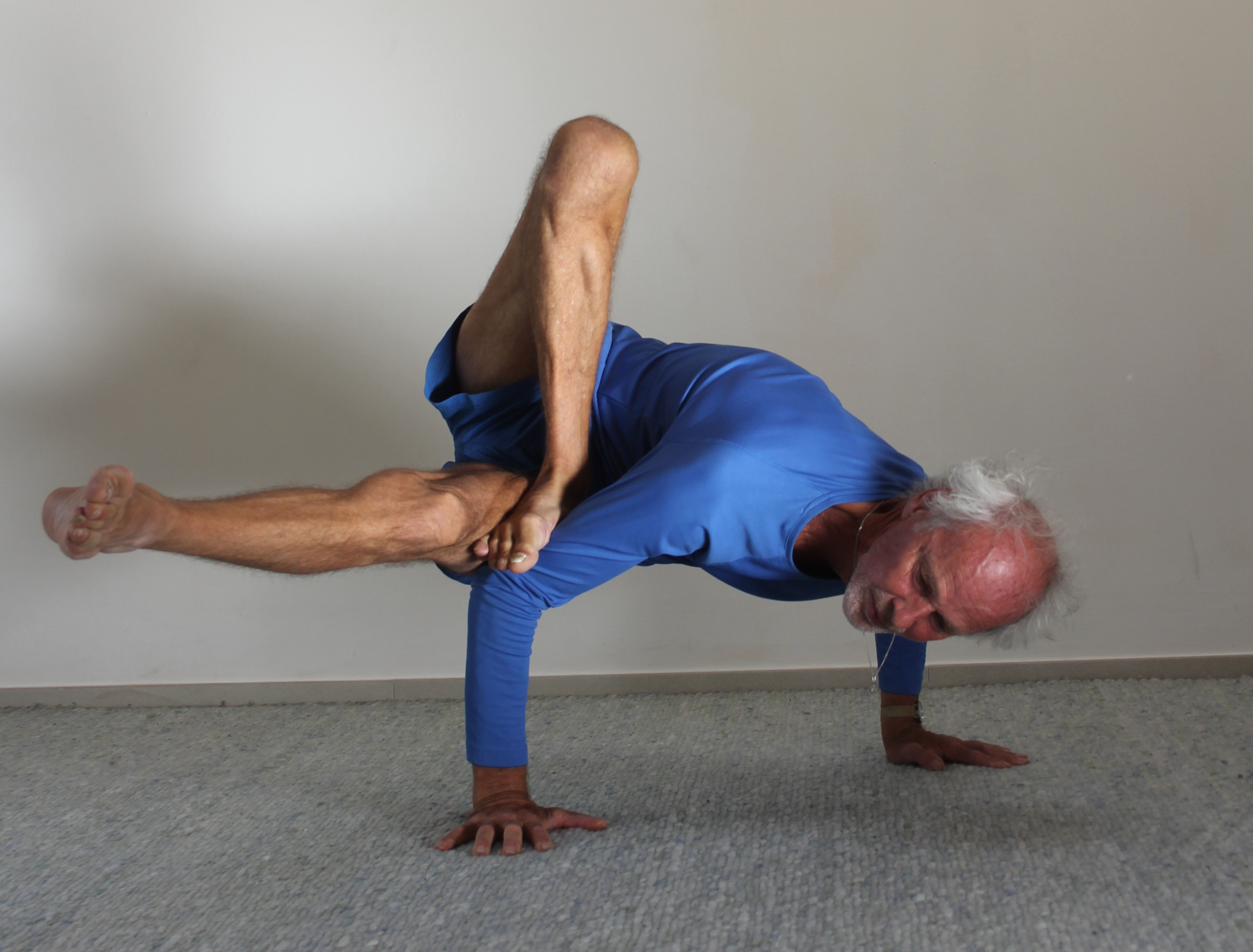
Eka Pada Bakasana

=== Preparation ===
The arms and shoulders can be strengthened for Crane/Crow by practising moving from High Plank to Low Plank. Other preparatory poses include Downward Dog Pose, Virasana (Hero Pose), and Malasana (Garland Pose).

== Claims ==
Twentieth century advocates of some schools of yoga, such as B. K. S. Iyengar, made claims for the effects of yoga on specific organs, without adducing any evidence. Iyengar claimed that this pose "strengthens the arms and abdominal organs since the latter are contracted."

== See also ==
- Bhujapidasana – a similar hand-balancing pose, with the feet crossed in front of the body
- Tittibhasana – a hand-balancing pose with the feet stretched straight out in front

== Sources ==
- Iyengar, B. K. S. (1991) [1966]. Light on Yoga. London: Thorsons. ISBN 978-0-00-714516-4. OCLC 51315708.
- Jain, Andrea (2015). Selling Yoga : from Counterculture to Pop culture. Oxford University Press. ISBN 978-0-19-939024-3. OCLC 878953765.
- Newcombe, Suzanne (2019). Yoga in Britain: Stretching Spirituality and Educating Yogis. Equinox Publishing. ISBN 978-1-78179-661-0.
