= Sritattvanidhi =

19th century Hindu iconographical treatise

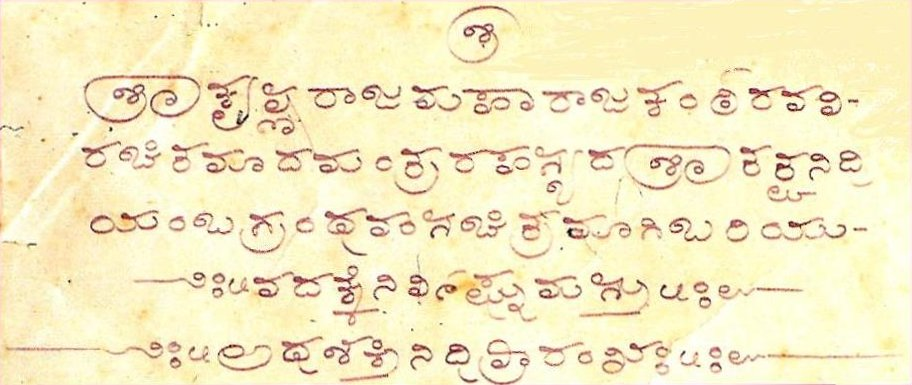
Opening page of the Kannada treatise Sritattvanidhi (19th century)

The Sritattvanidhi (Śrītattvanidhi, "The Illustrious Treasure of Realities") is a treatise written in the 19th century in the Kannada language in the Mysore Palace, Karnataka on the iconography and iconometry of divine figures in South India. One of its sections includes instructions for, and illustrations of, 122 hatha yoga postures.

== Authorship ==
The Sritattvanidhi is attributed to the then Maharaja of Mysore, Krishnaraja Woḍeyar III (b. 1794–d. 1868). The Maharaja was a great patron of art and learning, and was himself a scholar and writer. Around 50 works are ascribed to him. The first page of the Sritattvanidhi attributes authorship of the work to the Maharaja himself:

May the work Sri Tattvanidi, which is illustrated and contains secrets of mantras and which is authored by King Sri Krishna Raja Kamteerava, be written without any obstacle. Beginning of Shaktinidhi.

Martin-Dubost's review of the history of this work says that the Maharaja funded an effort to put together in one work all available information concerning the iconography and iconometry of divine figures in South India. He asked that a vast treatise be written, which he then had illustrated by miniaturists from his palace.

== Contents ==
The resulting illuminated manuscript, which he entitled the Sritattvanidhi, brings together several forms of Shiva, Vishnu, Skanda, Ganesha, different goddesses, the nine planets (navagraha), and the eight protectors of the cardinal points (aṣṭadikpālas). The work is in nine parts, each called a nidhi ("treasure"). The nine sections are:

1. Shakti nidhi, with thirty-two forms of Ganesha
2. Vishnu nidhi, with Vaishnava deities
3. Shiva nidhi, with Shaiva deities
4. Brahma nidhi, with Brahma, Indra, and the devas
5. Graha nidhi, with the nine planets of Hindu mythology
6. Vaishnava nidhi, with shaligrama stones that symbolise Vishnu
7. Shaiva nidhi, with lingam images
8. Agama nidhi, with tantric descriptions
9. Kautuka nidhi, with 122 asanas as a physical activity
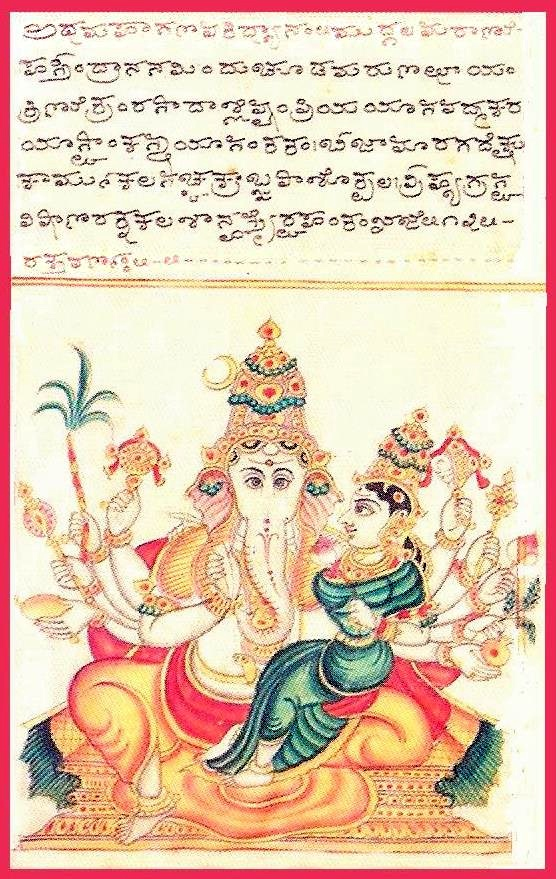
Section 3, Shiva nidhi, includes the thirty-two forms of Ganesha; Mahaganapati pictured

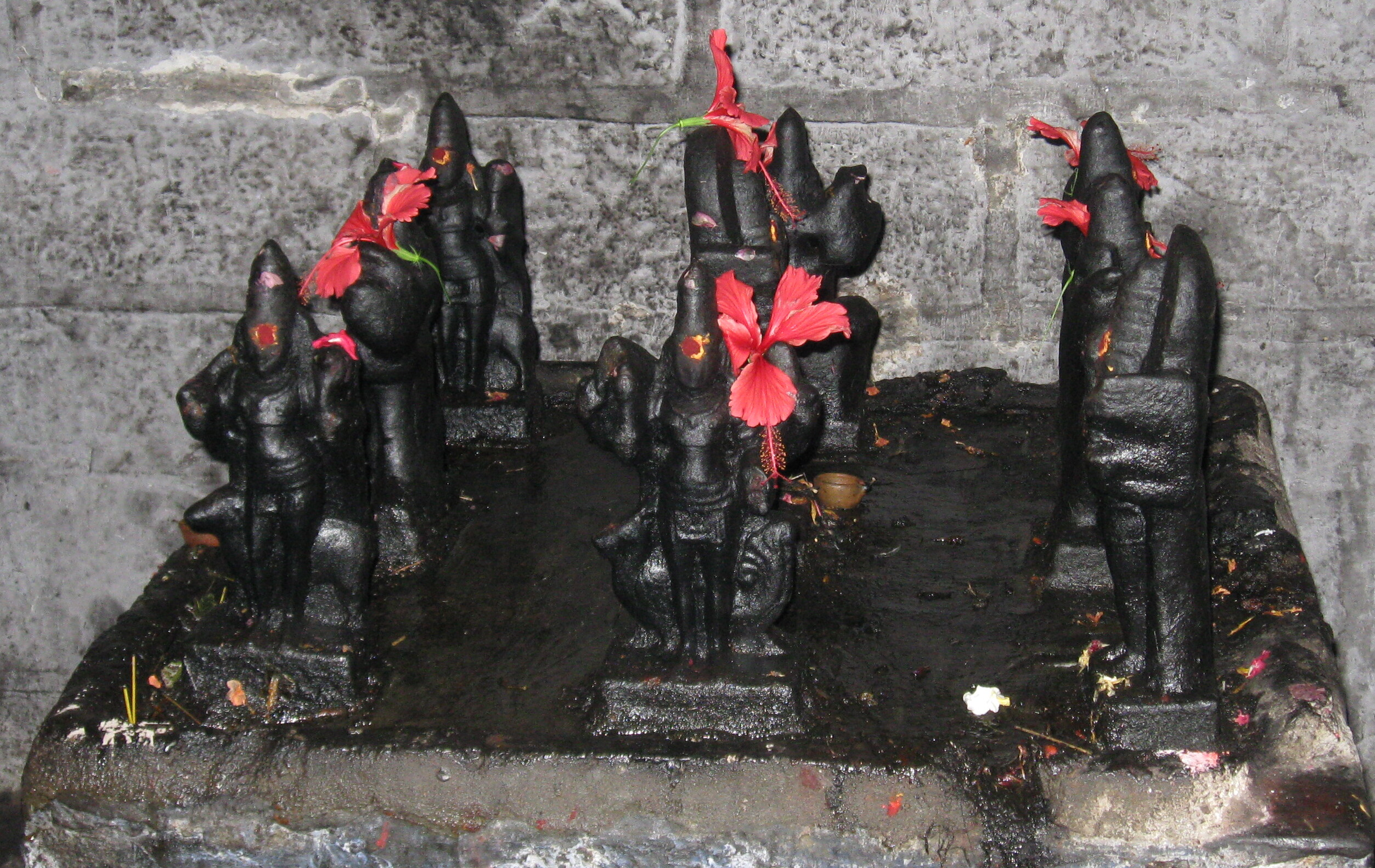
Section 5, Graha nidhi, with the nine planets (navagraha shrine pictured)

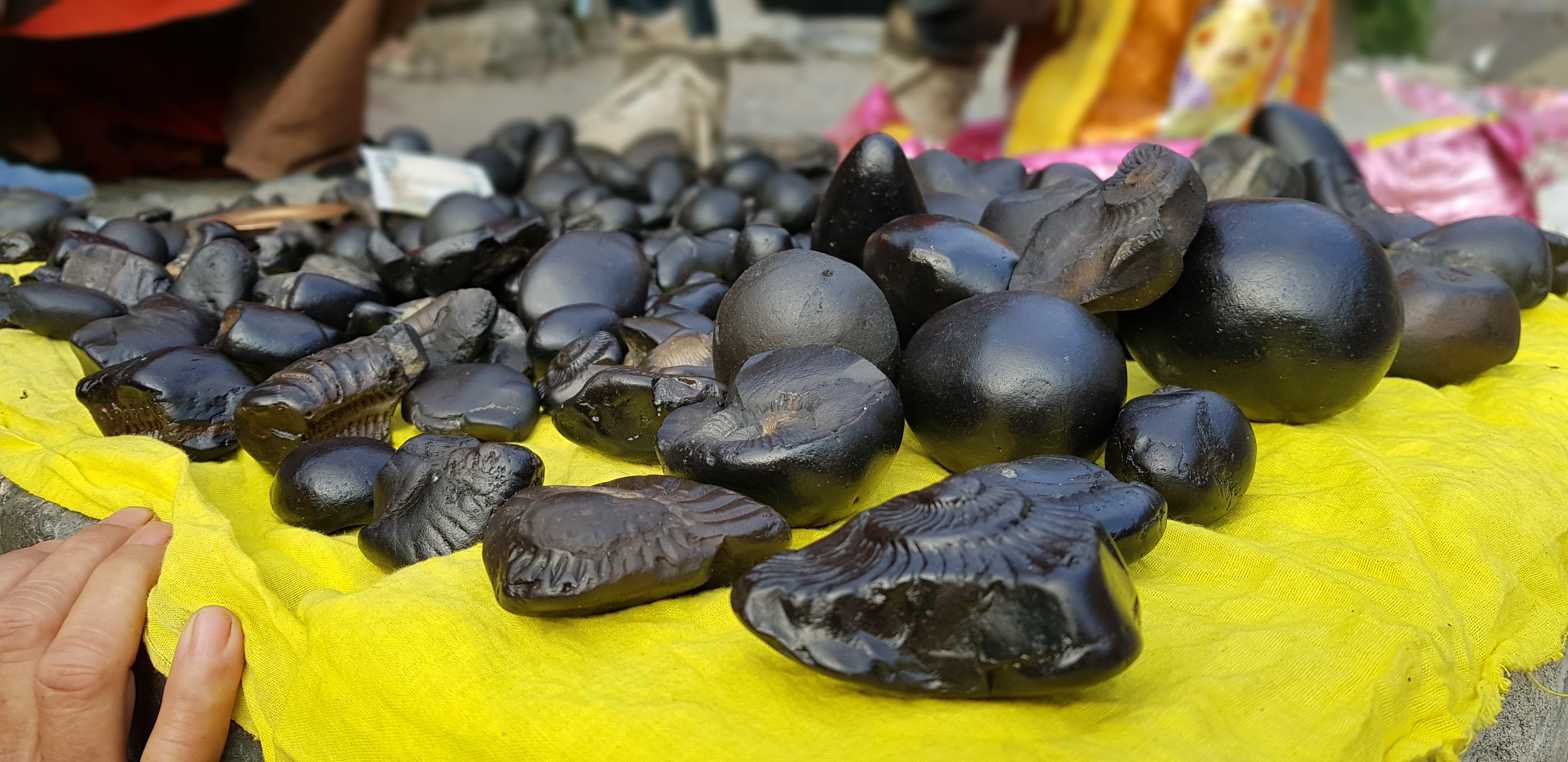
Section 6, Vaishnava nidhi, includes ammonite fossils, shaligrama stones, which serve as a non-anthropomorphic symbol of Vishnu

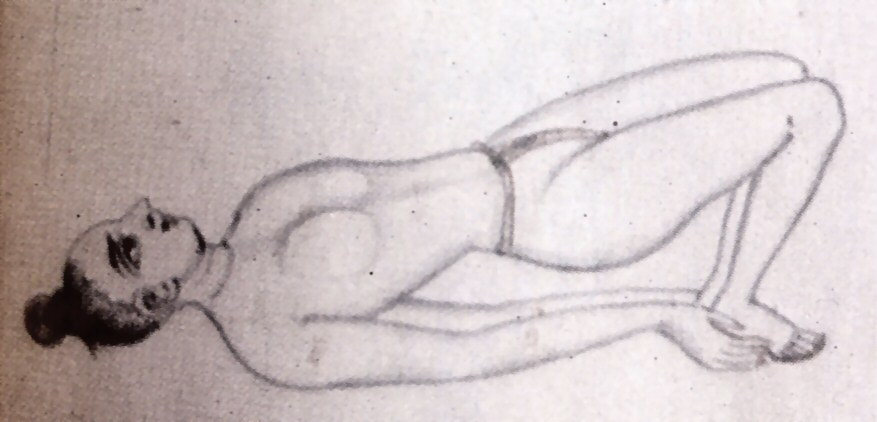
Section 9, Kautuka nidhi, with asanas ("Kamapithasana" pictured)

== Published editions ==
An original copy of this colossal work is available in the Oriental Research Institute at the University of Mysore. Another copy is in the possession of the royal family of Mysore. Several small books of parts of the Sritattvanidhi were printed on a lithographic press in the Mysore Palace.

In 1997, the Oriental Research Institute published three volumes (Saktinidhi, Vishnunidhi, and Sivanidhi) from the work.

== Influence on modern yoga ==
An important work on the subject is by the scholar of Sanskrit and hatha yoga, Norman Sjoman. His 1996 book The Yoga Tradition of the Mysore Palace presents the first English translation of the kautuka nidhi in the Sritattvanidhi, which provides instructions for and illustrations of 122 postures performed by a yogini in a topknot and loincloth. Some of these poses—which include handstands, backbends, foot-behind-the-head poses, lotus variations, and rope exercises—are familiar to modern practitioners, though most of the Sanskrit names differ from the ones they are known by today, but they are more elaborate than anything depicted in other pre-twentieth-century texts. Sjoman describes the origins of some asanas from a gymnastics exercise manual of the late 19th century, the Vyāyāma Dīpikā. Sjoman asserts that the influential yoga teacher Krishnamacharya, who did much to create modern yoga as exercise while teaching in the Mysore Palace, including training the yoga masters B. K. S. Iyengar and K. Pattabhi Jois there, was influenced by the Sritattvanidhi.

The yoga scholar-practitioners James Mallinson and Mark Singleton note that the Sritattvanidhi, like another late 18th or early 19th century text, the Hathabhyasapaddhati, indicates for the first time that yoga asanas may include "a wide variety of physical exercises, from squat thrusts to rope-climbing". In these texts, the asanas, too, have the sole purpose of making the body firm enough for the practice of the satkarmas.

The yoga scholars Jason Birch and Jacqueline Hargreaves describe the Sritattvanidhi as "a beautifully illustrated royal compendium commissioned by the Mahārāja of Mysore", noting that alongside other sources including "an unillustrated notebook in rudimentary Sanskrit", it demonstrates interest in asanas throughout Indian society.

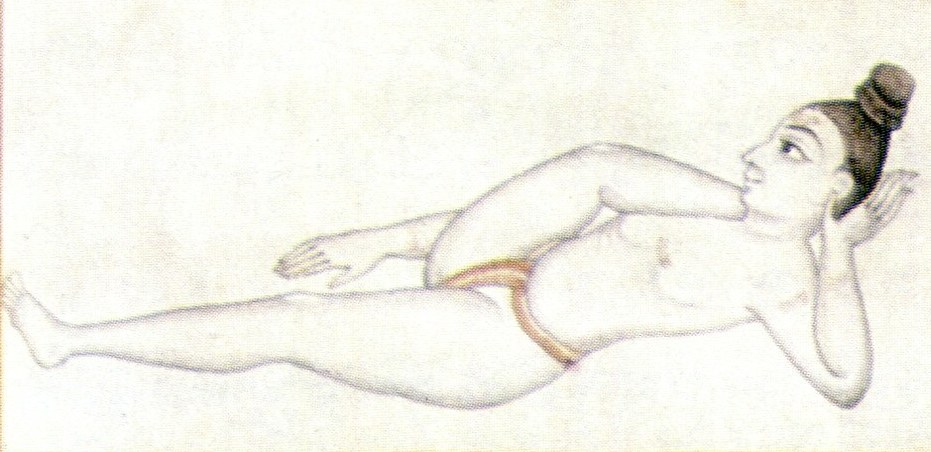
A yogini in Aṇkuśāsana, the Elephant goad pose

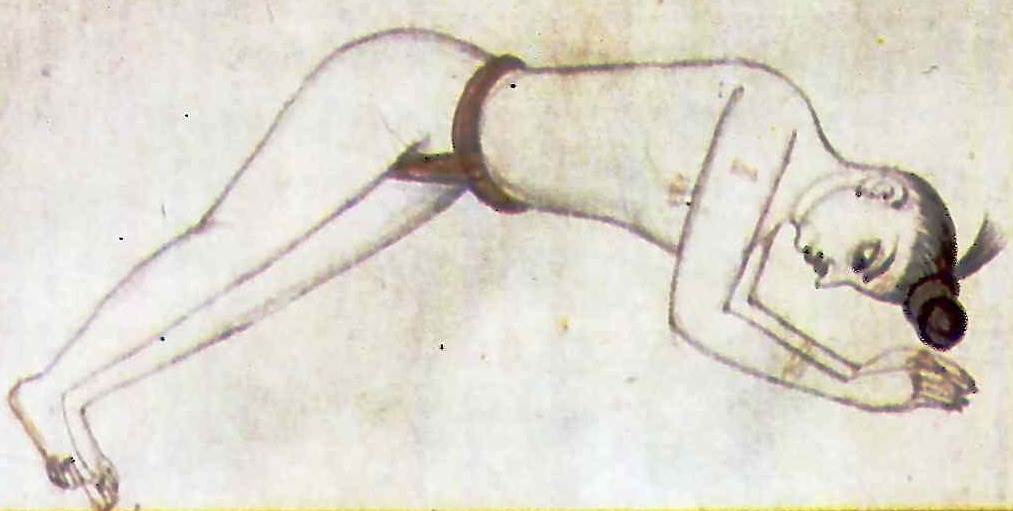
Gajasana, Elephant pose, a forerunner of Downward Dog

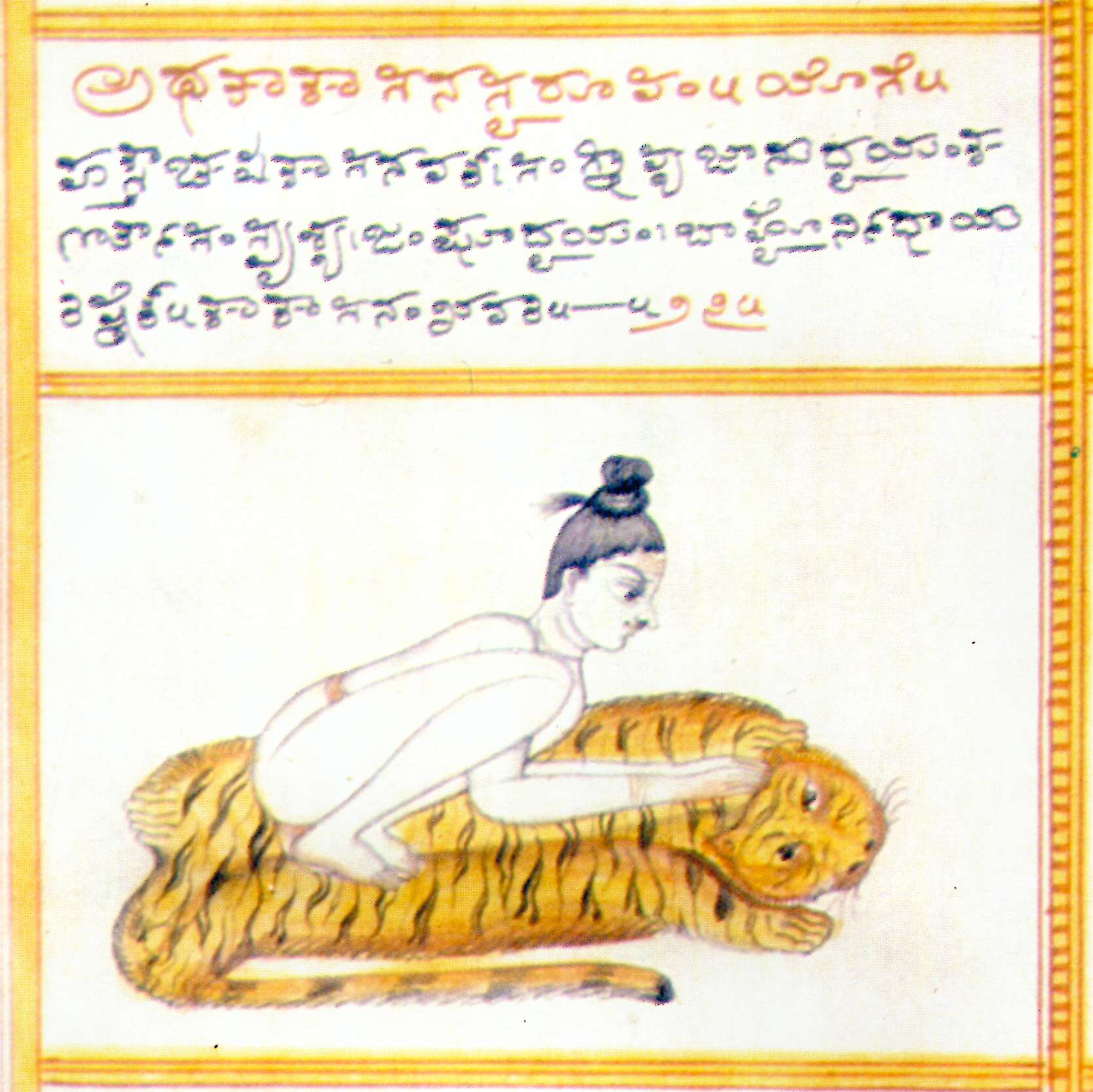
Kakasana, Crow Pose in the Sritattvanidhi

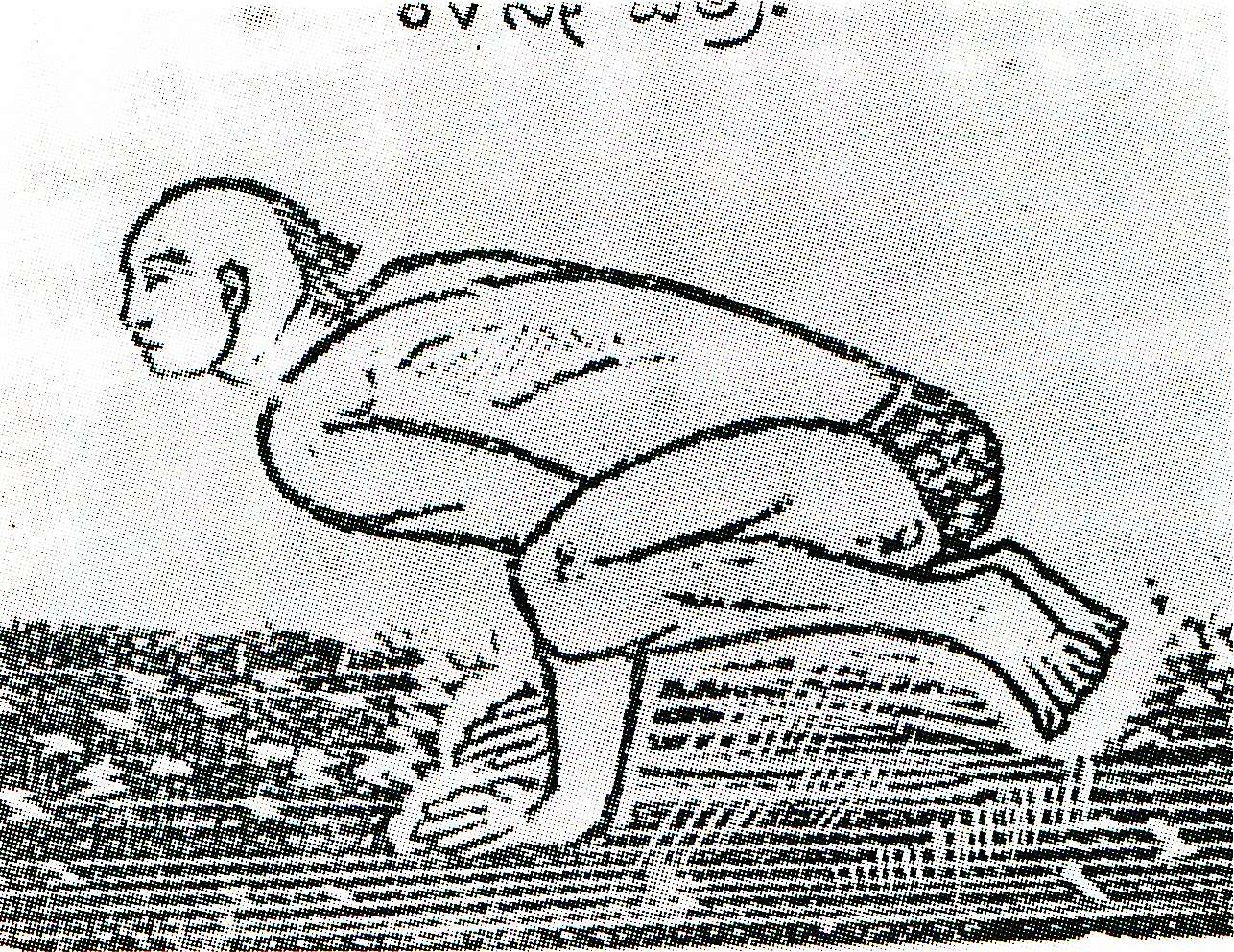
Engraving of "Bakasana" in the 1896 Vyāyāma Dīpikā (Light on Exercise)

== See also ==
- Wodeyar
- Hindu iconography
- Illuminated manuscript

== Cited sources ==
- Del Bontà, Robert J. (2000). "See Kṛṣṇa Run: Narrative Painting for Mummaḍi Kṛṣṇarāja Woḍeyar". Ars Orientalis. 30: 99–113. JSTOR 4629574.
- Gopal, R.; Prasad, S. Narendra (2004). mummaDi kRuShNarAja oDeyaru - oMdu cAriTrika adhyana [Mummaḍi Kṛṣṇarāja Woḍeyar - a Historic Study]. Karnataka: Directorate of Archeology and Museums.
- Mallinson, James; Singleton, Mark (2017). Roots of Yoga. Penguin Books. ISBN 978-0-241-25304-5. OCLC 928480104.
- Martin-Dubost, Paul (1997). Gaņeśa: The Enchanter of the Three Worlds. Mumbai: Project for Indian Cultural Studies. ISBN 81-900184-3-4.
- Sjoman, Norman E. (1999) [1996]. The Yoga Tradition of the Mysore Palace (2nd ed.). Abhinav Publications. ISBN 81-7017-389-2. Contains 20 color plate reproductions of 112 asanas reproduced from the Sri Tattvanidhi.
- Woḍeyar, Mummaḍi Kṛṣṇarāja (1997). Sritattvanidhi. Oriental Research Institute, University of Mysore. Volume 3, 2004
