= Norman Sjoman =

Canadian author and artist (born 1944)

Norman E. Sjoman (July 6, 1944, Mission, British Columbia – March 20, 2026, Calgary, Alberta) was known as author of the 1996 book The Yoga Tradition of the Mysore Palace, which contains an English translation of the yoga section of Sritattvanidhi, a 19th-century treatise by the Maharaja of Mysore, Krishnaraja Wodeyar III (b. 1794 - d. 1868). This book contributes an original view on the history and development of the teaching traditions behind modern asanas. According to Sjoman, a majority of the tradition of teaching yoga as exercise, spread primarily through the teachings of B. K. S. Iyengar and his students, "appears to be distinct from the philosophical or textual tradition [of hatha yoga], and does not appear to have any basis as a [genuine] tradition as there is no textual support for the asanas taught and no lineage of teachers."

== Education ==
Norman Sjoman studied at the University of British Columbia and Stockholm University. He obtained a PhD from the Centre of Advanced Studies in Sanskrit at Pune University, and a pandit degree from the Mysore Maharaja's Mahapathasala. He spent 20 years in India studying in Sanskrit, with several pandits. From part of that time, Sjoman studied yoga under B. K. S. Iyengar. He went on to teach at the University of California, Berkeley, the University of British Columbia, and the University of Calgary.

== The Yoga Tradition of the Mysore Palace ==
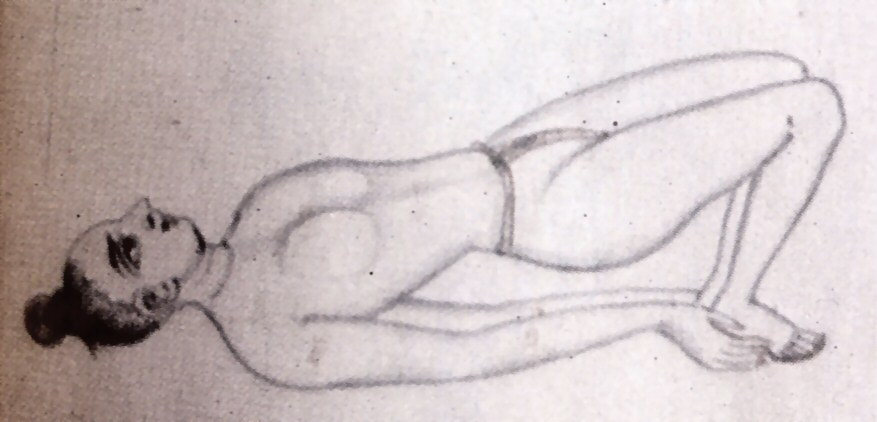
Sjoman discovered the illustrations of yoga asanas, such as Setubandhasana, in the 19th century Sritattvanidhi in the Mysore Palace.

In the mid 1980s, while doing research at the Mysore Palace, Sjoman made copies of the yoga section (9. Kautuka nidhi) of the Sritattvanidhi, a "colossal" illustrated compendium, authored in the 19th century in Karnataka by the then Maharaja. The book included diagrams of 122 yoga asanas. Unlike the few other known historical yoga treatises, the emphasis was solely on the physical activity. Some appeared based on Indian wrestling and other gymnastic exercises, in that aspect more closely resembling modern yoga as exercise forms such as Ashtanga (vinyasa) yoga. Both B. K. S. Iyengar and Pattabhi Jois, who are major influences on modern yoga forms, studied under teacher Tirumalai Krishnamacharya at the Mysore Palace in the 1930s. Sjoman further researched Krishnamacharya, finding several writings in the palace library. He discovered that the royal family, in the early 1900s, had employed a British gymnast to train the young princes. So, when Krishnamacharya arrived in the 1920s to start a yoga school, his schoolroom was the former gymnasium complete with ropes. Sjoman argues that several exercises detailed in a western gymnastics manual were incorporated into Krishnamacharya's syllabus, resulting in his vinyasa style, and further passed on to Iyengar and Jois. The Yoga Tradition of the Mysore Palace was published in 1996 including 122 asana illustrations and extracts from the gymnastics manual. Naturally, the radical, perhaps heretical, idea that some of the practice of modern yoga as exercise is based on something as mundane as British gymnastics caused a stir in the yoga world.

== Publications ==
- An Introduction to South Indian Music (with H.V. Dattatreya) Saraswati Project, Netherlands. 1986
- The Yoga Tradition of the Mysore Palace Abhinav Publications. New Delhi, India. 1996, 1999. ISBN 81-7017-389-2.
- A South Indian Treatise on the Kamasastra (with Swami Sivapriyananda). Abhinav Publications. New Delhi, India. 2000. ISBN 81-7017-388-4.
- Yoga Touchstone (with H.V. Dattatreya). Black Lotus Books. Calgary, Canada. 2004. ISBN 0-9736162-0-2
- Artists in Mysore (under the pseudonym Naramani Somanath). Black Lotus Books. Calgary, Canada. 2006. ISBN 0-9736162-1-0
- Dead Birds (with H.V. Dattatreya on accompanying DVD). Black Lotus Books. Calgary, Canada. 2007. ISBN 0-9736162-2-9
- Art: The Dark Side. Black Lotus Books. Calgary, Canada. 2010. ISBN 978-0-9736162-3-1
- Yogasutracintamani. Black Lotus Books, Calgary, Canada. 2013. ISBN 978-0-9736162-4-8

== See also ==
- Joseph Alter – anthropologist, author of Yoga in Modern India
- Mark Singleton - yoga scholar-practitioner, author of Yoga Body, which further explores the role of Mysore in the development of yoga as exercise
