= Light on Yoga =

1966 book on the Iyengar Yoga style of modern yoga as exercise

Light on Yoga: Yoga Dīpikā
- First edition
- Author: B. K. S. Iyengar
- Language: English
- Subject: Hatha Yoga
- Publisher: George Allen and Unwin
- Publication date: 1966

Light on Yoga: Yoga Dipika (Sanskrit: योग दीपिका, "Yoga Dīpikā") is a 1966 book on the Iyengar Yoga style of modern yoga as exercise by B. K. S. Iyengar, first published in English. It describes more than 200 yoga postures or asanas, and is illustrated with some 600 monochrome photographs of Iyengar demonstrating these.

The book has been described as the 'bible of modern yoga', and its presentation of the asanas has been called "unprecedented" and "encyclopedic".

It has been translated into at least 23 languages and has sold over three million copies.

== Context ==
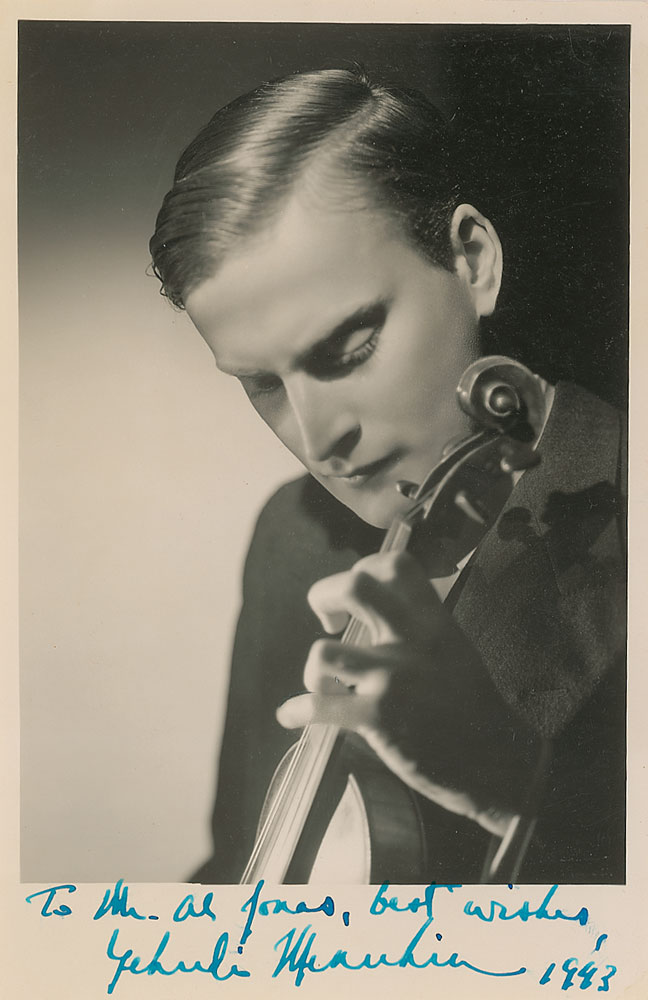
The violinist Yehudi Menuhin invited Iyengar to teach in Europe.

Yoga is a group of physical, mental, and spiritual practices from ancient India, forming one of the six orthodox schools of Hindu philosophical traditions. In the Western world, however, yoga is often taken to mean a modern form of medieval Hatha yoga, practised mainly for exercise, consisting largely of the postures called asanas.

B. K. S. Iyengar (1918-2014) was born in a poor family of Brahmins in Karnataka, India. In childhood he suffered from diseases including typhoid, malaria and tuberculosis, and became extremely stiff. At the age of 18 he decided to spend his life doing yoga, and by 1938 he was already performing the asanas fluently. The violinist Yehudi Menuhin became his pupil in 1952 and then invited him to teach in Europe, which he did from the 1960s. Iyengar made yoga popular, first in India and then around the world.

== Book ==
=== Publication ===
Light on Yoga was first published in English by George Allen and Unwin in 1966, with a foreword by his pupil, the violinist Yehudi Menuhin. Revised editions were brought out in 1968 and 1976. A paperback edition was published by The Aquarian Press in 1991 under the Thorsons imprint. The book became an international best-seller; it has been translated into at least 23 languages including Chinese, Czech, Hebrew, Japanese, Hungarian, Portuguese, Russian, and Thai and has sold over three million copies.

=== Contents ===
Utthita Trikonasana, the extended triangle pose, an innovation basic to Iyengar Yoga. A yoga brick, another of Iyengar's innovations, is helping to ensure correct alignment.

The book has three parts: a technical introduction to yoga, in which hatha yoga is explained to be one of the eight limbs of yoga; a detailed illustrated description of the asanas (some 200 postures, illustrated by some 600 monochrome photographs of Iyengar), (Note: Iyengar 1991, pp. 57–424) followed by a brief account of the bandhas and kriyas; (Note: Iyengar 1991, pp. 425–428) and an account of pranayama, yoga breathing. (Note: Iyengar 1991, pp. 431–461) An appendix defines a set of asana courses, i.e. which postures to do each week, building up in difficulty, in courses structured to last up to 300 weeks. (Note: Iyengar 1991, pp. 462–486) A second appendix defines the asanas supposed to be "curative" for a range of diseases and conditions from "Acidity" to "Varicose Veins". (Note: Iyengar 1991, pp. 487–506) The book has a glossary of all the Sanskrit terms employed. (Note: Iyengar 1991, pp. 513–536)

=== Approach ===
Each asana is named in Sanskrit with its etymology, graded, and described separately with two or more pages of text and monochrome photographs of Iyengar. For example, Utthita Trikonasana, the extended triangle pose, is stated to be at grade 3 out of a possible 60 in terms of difficulty. The technique for going into the triangle pose, performing it, and returning from it, is described in eight steps. The technique is written as a set of instructions, such as "Inhale deeply and with a jump spread apart the legs sideways 3 to 3½ feet". Its claimed effects on the muscles and body are described in a concluding paragraph. The three photographs show Iyengar in a preparatory pose and then in the triangle pose itself from front and rear.

=== Illustrations ===
Unprecedented: page with four illustrations, showing the positioning, size, and style of the images, and the degree of attention given to a single pose, here Mulabandhasana

The scholar-practitioner Norman Sjoman notes that Light on Yoga served to popularise the practice of asanas more than any previous book for three reasons, namely the large number of asanas illustrated, the "clear no-nonsense descriptions, and the obvious refinement of the illustrations."

The approximately 600 illustrations of the 200 asanas are all monochrome photographs (though many paperback editions have a later colour photograph on the cover). Within the confines of a conventionally sized book, the photographs are never more than about 3 inches (7.6 cm) by 2 inches (5.1 cm). All are of Iyengar, dressed only in a pair of briefs and a necklace string. The images are sometimes shown three (e.g. for Koundinyasana) (Note: Iyengar 1991, p. 331) or four (e.g. for Mulabandhasana) to a page, generally and in those cases illustrating a single asana. (Note: Iyengar 1991, p. 345) The degree of attention to detail in the illustrations may be understood from the coverage of one asana, Sarvangasana (Shoulder Stand), which is illustrated with 15 photographs of the main pose, and 37 more of the "Sarvangasana cycle". (Note: Iyengar 1991, pp. 207–237)

== Reception ==
Light on Yoga has become known as the "bible" of yoga; Publishers Weekly wrote that it "set the standard" for books about yoga, with instructions and illustrations of the poses. The yoga scholar Mark Singleton, writing in Yoga Journal, called the presentation of the asanas "unprecedented" and "encyclopedic", describing Light on Yoga as "the most influential do-it-yourself yoga book of all time".

Yehudi Menuhin, in his foreword to the book, wrote that "Whoever has had the privilege of receiving Mr Iyengar's attention, or of witnessing the precision, refinement and beauty of his art, is introduced to that vision of perfection and innocence which is man as first created — unarmed, unashamed, son of God, lord of creation — in the Garden of Eden".

The scholar of religion Andrea Jain observes that the book "prescribed a thoroughly individualistic system of postural yoga", one that was "rigorous and disciplined", requiring "belts, bricks, and ropes". She quotes Elizabeth De Michelis as writing that it "instantly became the global standard reference on modern yoga as a body practice." Jain argues that Light on Yoga had the particular attraction for a consumer audience that its clear stepwise instructions enabled them to practice at home, and to read about the "biomedical explanations of each posture and its fitness and health benefits." Jain notes also that the book built up the Iyengar Yoga brand by claiming a connection to the ancient tradition of yoga as far back as Patanjali's Yoga Sutras, for instance with the epigraphic prayer to Patanjali at the front of the book.

Michelle Goldberg, in The New Yorker, states that the book "remains unparallelled as a guide to asana practice", and quotes Yoga Journal as saying "when 'teachers refer to the correct way to do a posture, they're usually alluding to the alignment Mr. Iyengar instructs and expertly models in his book.'" She notes that while Iyengar attributes the asanas to Patanjali's Yoga Sutras, he was being "too modest. It was he, not any ancient sage, who figured out how to show people the world over the safest way to stand on their heads." For example, she explains, the triangle pose and the Sun Salutation "don't appear in any ancient yogic text" but were put together into a method by Iyengar's brother-in-law and first teacher, Krishnamacharya.

The yoga scholar-practitioner Norman Sjoman praises the book, with its "clear no-nonsense descriptions and the obvious refinement of the illustrations".

Derek Beres, writing in Big Think, called the book "wildly popular" and "essentially the bible for yoga practitioners." He describes some of the science that Iyengar claims for yoga as suspect: "Iyengar had a habit of calling things proven even though no actual scientific research had been conducted." Beres tried Iyengar yoga alongside the "more aerobic Vinyasa" style, and "always appreciated [Iyengar yoga's] anatomical focus and the emphasis on breath before anything else."

The yoga teacher Bernie Gourley notes the book's strengths, the asanas "with his perfect alignment", but also that the book does not "systematically address contraindications" to each asana, nor does it provide evidence for the claimed benefits.

The Light on Yoga project by the yoga teacher Jack Cuneo and the photographer Rick Cummings has attempted to photograph all the yoga poses in the book, to be followed by restating all the instructions in Cuneo's own words.

== See also ==
- Complete Illustrated Book of Yoga - Swami Vishnudevananda's bestselling 1960 yoga handbook
- Yoga the Iyengar Way - a 1990 handbook to the major asanas by three senior Iyengar teachers

== Sources ==
- Feuerstein, Georg (2012). The Yoga Tradition: Its History, Literature, Philosophy and Practice. Hohm Press. ISBN 978-1-935387-39-8.
- Iyengar, B. K. S. (1991) [1966]. Light on Yoga. London: Thorsons. ISBN 978-0-00-714516-4. OCLC 51315708.
- Jain, Andrea (2015). Selling Yoga : from Counterculture to Pop culture. Oxford University Press. ISBN 978-0-19-939024-3. OCLC 878953765.
- Jain, Andrea (July 2016). "The Popularization of Modern Yoga". Oxford Research Encyclopedias. doi:10.1093/acrefore/9780199340378.013.163. ISBN 978-0-19-934037-8.
- Singleton, Mark (2010). Yoga Body: the Origins of Modern Posture Practice. Oxford University Press. ISBN 978-0-19-539534-1. OCLC 318191988.
- Sjoman, Norman E. (1999) [1996]. The Yoga Tradition of the Mysore Palace (2nd ed.). New Delhi, India: Abhinav Publications. ISBN 978-81-7017-389-2.
