= List of asanas =

List of postures in hatha yoga and yoga as exercise

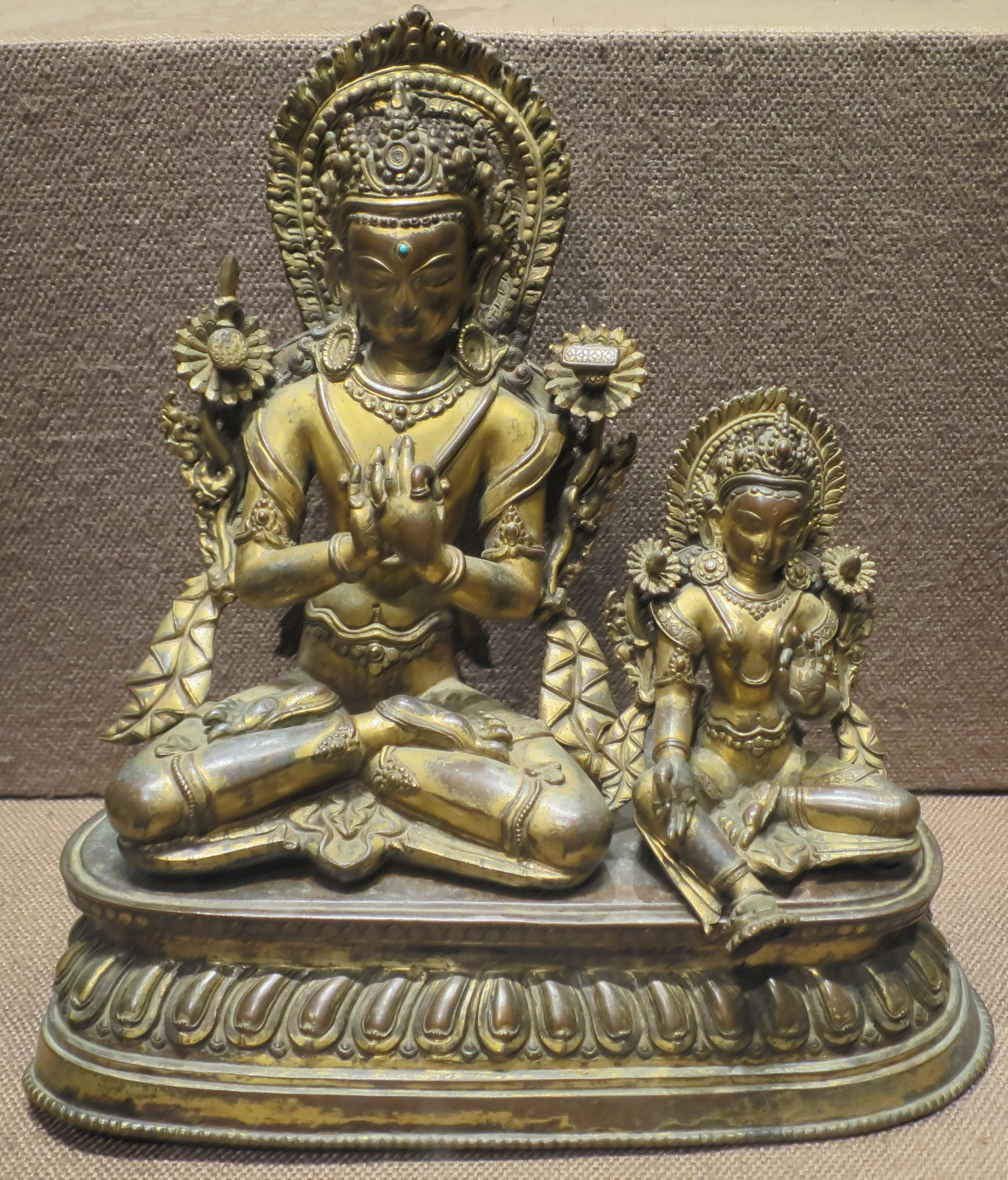
Padmāsana, lotus pose, used for meditation. Gilt bronze statue of Bodhisattva Manjusri and Prajnaparamita, Nepal, c. 1575

An asana (Sanskrit: आसन, IAST: āsana) is a body posture, used in both medieval hatha yoga and modern yoga. The term is derived from the Sanskrit word for 'seat'. While many of the oldest mentioned asanas are indeed seated postures for meditation, asanas may be standing, seated, arm-balances, twists, inversions, forward bends, backbends, or reclining in prone or supine positions. The asanas have been given a variety of English names by competing schools of yoga.

The traditional number of asanas is the symbolic 84, but different texts identify different selections, sometimes listing their names without describing them. (Note: 84's symbolism may derive from its astrological and numerological properties: it is the product of 7, the number of planets in astrology, and 12, the number of signs of the zodiac, while in numerology, 7 is the sum of 3 and 4, and 12 is the product, i.e. 84 is (3+4)×(3×4).) Some names have been given to different asanas over the centuries, and some asanas have been known by a variety of names, making tracing and the assignment of dates difficult. For example, the name Muktasana is now given to a variant of Siddhasana with one foot in front of the other, but has also been used for Siddhasana and other cross-legged meditation poses. As another example, the headstand is now known by the 20th century name Shirshasana, but an older name for the pose is Kapalasana. Sometimes, the names have the same meaning, as with Bidalasana and Marjariasana, both meaning Cat Pose.

== Affixes ==
Variations on the basic asanas are indicated by Sanskrit affixes including the following:

English	Sanskrit	Meaning	Example
Adho	अधो	downward	Adho Mukha Shvanasana (downward [facing] dog)
Ardha	अर्ध	half	Ardha Padmasana (half lotus)
Baddha	बद्ध	bound	Baddha Konasana (bound angle)
Dvi	द्वि	two	Dvi Pada Kaundinyasana (two-legged Kaundinya)
Eka	एक	one	Eka Pada Shirshasana (one-legged headstand)
Kon	कोण	angle	Parshvakonasana (side angle)
Parshva	पार्श्व	side	Parshva Bakasana (side crane)
Parivritta	परिवृत्त	revolved	Parivritta Trikonasana (reverse triangle)
Prasarita	प्रसारित	spread out	Prasarita Padottanasana (wide stance forward bend)
Salamba	सालम्ब	supported	Salamba Shirshasana (supported headstand)
Supta	सुप्त	supine, reclining	Supta Virasana (reclining hero)
Upavishta	उपविष्ठ	seated	Upavishta Konasana (wide-angle seated forward bend)
Urdhva	ऊर्ध्व	upwards	Urdhva Dhanurasana (upwards bow)
Utthita	उत्थित	extended	Utthita Trikonasana (extended triangle)
Viparita	विपरीत	inverted	Viparita Dandasana (inverted staff)

== Asanas ==
A single asana is listed for each main pose, whether or not there are variations. Thus for Sirsasana (Yoga headstand), only one pose is illustrated, although the pose can be varied by moving the legs apart sideways or front-and-back, by lowering one leg to the floor, by folding the legs into lotus posture, by turning the hips to one side, by placing the hands differently on the ground, and so on. Iyengar's 1966 Light on Yoga lists 15 variations on the basic headstand, including for instance the combined variation Parivrttaikapada Sirsasana in which not only are the hips revolved but the legs are apart front-and-back. Since then, variations of many other poses have been created; their names are not listed here. Yin Yoga names are for the equivalent Yin variants; these are usually somewhat different from the conventional (Yang) poses.

Indian texts are "notoriously difficult to date". The table shows the approximate date and abbreviated title of the earliest document or authority to describe that asana (not only naming it), as follows:

- AS = Ahirbudhnya Saṃhitā, c. 7th century
- BaH = Bahr al-Hayāt, 17th century
- DU = Darśana Upaniṣad, c. 4th century
- GhS = Gheraṇḍa Saṃhitā, 17th century
- GS = Gorakṣaśataka, 10th century
- HAP = Hațhābhyāsapaddhati, 18th century
- HR = Haṭha Ratnāvali, 17th century
- HY = Hemacandra's Yogaśāstra, 11th century
- HYP = Haṭha Yoga Pradīpikā, 15th century
- JP = Joga Pradīpikā, 18th century
- LoY = Light on Yoga, 1966
- PL = Post-Light on Yoga (Note: PL, Post-Light on Yoga poses, are marked as '21st C.' to sort late 20th as well as 21st century asanas after TK and LoY.)
- PSV = Pātañjalayogaśāstravivaraṇa, 8th century
- ShS = Śiva Saṃhitā, 14th century
- ST = Śrītattvanidhi, 19th century
- TB = Theos Bernard, 1950
- TK = Tirumalai Krishnamacharya, c. 1940
- V = Vimānārcanākalpa, 10th century
- VM = Vivekamārtaṇḍa, 13th century
- VS = Vāsiṣṭha Saṁhitā, 13th century

Asana	Sanskrit	English	Type	Effect on spine	Suitable for meditation	Described (Note: Sjoman notes that the names of asanas have been used "promiscuous[ly]", making their history difficult to trace: the presence of matching names is not proof of continuity, since the same name may mean a different pose, and a pose may have been known by other names at different times. The dates here are therefore based on documents which provide actual descriptions of the asanas.)	Yin Yoga variant (Note: The Yin Yoga variants are similar but not identical to their 'Yang' equivalents.)	Image
Adho Mukha Shvanasana	अधोमुखश्वानासन	Downward-Facing Dog	Standing	Forward bend		20th C. TK; 18th C. HAP (in dynamic pose "Gajāsana")		
Adho Mukha Vrikshasana	अधोमुखवृक्षासन	Downward-Facing Tree, Yoga Handstand	Balancing			18th C. HAP		
Akarna Dhanurasana	आकर्णधनुरासन	Shooting bow, Archer, Bow and arrow	Sitting			19th C. ST (as Dhanurāsana)		
Anantasana	अनन्तासन	Ananta's pose, Vishnu's Couch pose	Reclining			20th C. LoY		
Anjaneyasana	अञ्जनेयासन	Crescent Moon	Standing	Backbend		20th C.	Dragon	Variation with arms down
Ardha Chandrasana	अर्धचन्द्रासन	Half moon	Standing			20th C. LoY		
Ashtanga Namaskara	अष्टाङ्ग नमस्कार	Eight-Limbed Salutation; Caterpillar	Reclining			20th C. TK		
Astavakrasana	अष्टावक्रासन	Aṣṭāvakra's pose, Eight-angled	Balancing			20th C. LoY		
Baddha Konasana; Bhadrasana	बद्धकोणासन	Bound angle, Cobbler's pose	Sitting		Meditation	15th C. HYP; 17th C. GhS	Butterfly	
Bakasana; Kakasana	बकासन, ककासन	Crane (arms straight); Crow (arms bent)	Balancing			17th C. HR		
Balasana	बालासन	Child	Sitting			20th C. TK; 19th C. ST Ananda Balasana (as Kandukasana)	Child's	
Bhairavasana; Ankushasana	भैरवासन अण्कुशासन	Formidable	Reclining			19th C. ST		
Bharadvajasana	भरद्वाजासन	Bharadvaja's twist	Sitting	Twist		20th C. LoY	Seated Twist	
Bhekasana	भेकासन	Frog	Reclining	Backbend		20th C. LoY		
Bhujangasana	भुजङ्गासन	Cobra	Reclining	Backbend		17th C. GhS 2.42	Seal, Sphinx	
Bhujapidasana	भुजपीडासन	Arm-pressing posture	Balancing			20th C. LoY	Snail	
Bidalasana; Marjariasana	बिडालासन मार्जरीआसन	Cat	Kneeling	Backbend		20th C. T.K.V. Desikachar, Satyananda Saraswati		
Chaturanga Dandasana	चतुरङ्गदण्डासन	Four-Limbed Staff; Low Plank	Reclining			20th C. TK		
Dandasana	दण्डासन	Staff	Sitting			8th C. PSV		
Dhanurasana	धनुरासन	Bow	Reclining	Backbend		15th C. HYP 1.27		
Durvasasana	दुर्वासासन	Durvasa's Pose	Standing, Balancing			19th C. ST (as 'Trivikramasana')		
Garbha Pindasana	गर्भासन	Embryo in Womb	Sitting			17th C. BaH		
Garudasana	गरुडासन	Eagle	Standing, Balancing			19th C. ST (Note: GhS uses the name Garuḍāsana for a different pose.)		
Gomukhasana	गोमुखासन	Cow-faced	Sitting		Meditation	4th C. DU 3.3–4; 7th C. AS; 10th C. V 15th C. HYP 1.20; 17th C. HR 3	Shoelace	
Gorakshasana	गोरक्षासन	Cowherd; Gorakhnath's pose	Sitting		Meditation	14th C. ShS 3.108-112; 15th C. HYP 1.28-29; 17th C. GhS 2.24-25		
Halasana	हलासन	Plough	Inversion	Forward bend		19th C. ST (as Lāṇgalāsana, plough); 20th C. TB		
Hanumanasana	हनुमनासन	Hanuman's Pose	Sitting			20th C. TK		
Janusirsasana	जानुशीर्षासन	Head-to-Knee	Sitting	Forward Bend		20th C. TK		
Jathara Parivartanasana	ञटर परिवर्तनासन	Belly twist	Reclining	Twist		20th C. LoY		
Kapotasana	कपोतासन	Pigeon	Kneeling	Backbend		20th C. LoY		
Karnapidasana	कर्णपीडासन	Ear-pressing	Inversion	Forward bend		20th C. TB (as variant of Halasana); LoY		
Kaundinyasana	कौण्डिन्यसन	Kaundinya's pose	Balancing			20th C. LoY		
Kraunchasana	क्रौञ्चासन	Heron	Sitting			17th C. HR		
Kukkutasana	कुक्कुटासन	Cockerel	Balancing			7th C. AS; 13th C. VS; 15th C. HYP 1.23; 17th C. GhS 2.31		
Kurmasana	कूर्मासन	Tortoise	Sitting	Forward bend		7th C. AS		
Lolasana	लोलासन	Pendant	Balancing			20th C. (Note: Not yet yoga in 1896 as Jhūla pose in Vyayama Dipika gymnastics book) (Note: LoY has the legs as in Gomukhasana, not in Padmasana.)		
Makarasana	मकरासन	Crocodile	Reclining			17th C. GhS 2.40 (Note: LoY quotes and interprets GhS 2.40 as meaning a variant of Salabhasana, the legs stretched out and raised, the arms as GhS states on the head, also raised; Saraswati has the head supported with elbows on the ground; a widespread modern form has feet and head on the ground.)		
Malasana	मालासन	Garland	Squatting	Forward bend		20th C. LoY		
Mandukasana	मन्दुकासन	Frog	Sitting			17th C. GhS		
Marichyasana	मरीच्यासन	Marichi's Pose	Sitting	Twist		20th C. TK		
Matsyasana	मत्स्यासन	Fish	Reclining	Backbend		17th C. GhS 2.21	Fish	
Matsyendrasana	मत्स्येन्द्रासन	Lord of the Fishes; Matsyendra's pose	Sitting	Twist		15th C. HYP 1.28-29; 17th C. GhS		
Mayurasana	मयूरासन	Peacock	Balancing			10th C. V 15th C. HYP 1.33		
Muktasana	मुक्तासन	Liberated	Sitting		Meditation	10th C. V (Note: Several sitting meditation poses have been called Muktasana.)		
Natarajasana	नटराजासन	Lord of the Dance; Dancer; Nataraja's Pose	Standing	Backbend		20th C. TK		
Navasana; Naukasana	नावासन, परिपूर्णनावासन नौकासन	Boat	Sitting	Forward bend		19th C. ST		
Padmasana	पद्मासन	Lotus	Sitting		Meditation	4th C. DU; 8th C. PSV		
Parighasana	परिघासन	Gate	Standing			20th C. TK		
Parshvakonasana	पार्श्वकोणासन	Side angle	Standing			20th C. TK		
Parshvottanasana	पार्श्वोत्तनासन	Intense side stretch	Standing			20th C. TK		
Pashasana	पाशासन	Noose	Squatting	Twist		19th C. ST		
Paschimottanasana	पश्चिमोत्तानासन	Seated Forward Bend	Sitting	Forward Bend		15th C. HYP 1:28; 17th C. GhS 2:26	Full Forward Bend, Caterpillar	
Pincha Mayurasana	पिञ्चमयूरासन	Feathered Peacock	Balancing			20th C. LoY		
Prasarita Padottanasana	प्रसारित पादोत्तानासन	Wide Stance Forward Bend	Standing	Forward bend		20th C. TK		
Rajakapotasana	राजकपोतासन	King Pigeon	Sitting	Backbend		20th C. LoY	Swan, Sleeping Swan	
Shalabhasana	शलभासन	Locust	Reclining	Backbend		20th C. TB		
Sarvangasana	सालम्बसर्वाङ्गासन	Shoulderstand	Inversion			20th C. (this name); 19th C. as Viparita Karani in JP; 15th C. HYP		
Samakonasana	समकोणासन	Side splits	Sitting			20th C. TK		
Shavasana	शवासन	Corpse	Reclining			15th C. HYP 1.32	Corpse	
Setu Bandha Sarvangasana	सेतुबन्धसर्वाङ्गासन	Shoulder supported bridge	Inversion	Backbend		19th C. ST, called Kāmapīṭhāsana		
Siddhasana (men), Siddha Yoni Asana (women)	सिद्धासन	Accomplished, The Adept's Pose	Sitting		Meditation	10th C. GS 1.10-12		
Simhasana	सिंहासन	Lion	Sitting		Meditation	4th C. DU; 10th C. V		
Shirshasana; Kapalasana	शीर्षासन	Headstand, Yoga Headstand	Inversion			11th C. HY(called Duryodhanāsana or Kapālīkarana); 14th C. ShS 4.45-47 (as Viparita Karani); 15th C. HYP 3.78-81 (ditto); 17th C. GhS 3.33-35 (ditto); 18th C. JP (as Kapala āsana)		
Sukhasana	सुखासन	Easy	Sitting		Meditation	4th C. DU	Easy	
Supta Padangusthasana	सुप्त पादाङ्गुष्ठासन	Big toe supine	Reclining			20th C. TK		
Surya Namaskar	सुर्य नमस्कार	Salute to the Sun; Sun Salutation	Standing	Forward bend, backbend sequence		20th C. Rajah of Aundh, then TK		
Svastikasana	स्वस्तिकसन	Auspicious; Lucky mark	Sitting		Meditation	8th C. PSV	Square	
Tadasana	ताडासन	Mountain	Standing			20th C. TK		
Tittibhasana	टिट्टिभासन	Firefly	Balancing			19th C. ST (as Mālāsana)		
Trikonasana, Utthita Trikonasana	त्रिकोणासन, उत्थित त्रिकोणासन	Triangle	Standing			20th C. TK		
Trivikramasana	त्रिविक्रमासन	Trivikrama's pose Standing splits Supta Trivikramasana (reclining variant)	Standing, Balancing			13th - 18th C. in Bharatnatyam dance statues of Eastern Gopuram, Nataraja Temple, Chidambaram		
Tulasana	तुलासन	Balance / Scales	Balancing			20th C. LoY		
Upavishta Konasana	उपविष्टकोणासन	Open Angle	Sitting			20th C. TK	Dragonfly	
Urdhva Dhanurasana; Chakrasana	ऊर्ध्वधनुरासन, चक्रासन	Upwards-facing bow, Wheel	Inversion	Backbend		19th C. ST (as Paryaṇkāsana)		
Urdhva Mukha Shvanasana	ऊर्ध्वमुखश्वानासन	Upward-Facing Dog	Reclining	Backbend		20th C. TK		
Ushtrasana	उष्ट्रासन	Camel	Kneeling	Backbend		20th C. LoY		
Utkatasana	उत्कटासन	Awkward or Powerful	Standing			15th C. HYP (squatting); 17th C. GhS 20th C. TK (chair-like)		
Uttanasana	उत्तानासन	Standing Forward Bend	Standing	Forward bend		20th C. TB (as Padahastasana); TK		
Utthita Hastapadangusthasana	उत्थित हस्तपादाङ्गुष्ठासन	Standing Big Toe Hold (I: leg to the side; II: leg to the front)	Standing			20th C. TK		
Vajrasana	वज्रासन	Thunderbolt	Kneeling		Meditation	17th C. GhS (may mean Virasana)		
Vasishtasana	वसिष्ठासन	Vasishta's pose, Side plank	Balancing			20th C. TK		
Viparita Dandasana	विपरीत दण्डासन	Inverted Staff	Inversion	Backbend		20th C. TK?, LoY		
Viparita Karani; Uttanapadasana (variant)	विपरीतकरणि	Inverted practice Legs up the wall	Inversion			13th C. VM for pratyahara 14th C. ShS 4.45-47; 15th C. HYP 3.78-81; 17th C. GhS 3.33-35 and other texts (Note: Viparita Karani is an inverted practice rather than an asana; the ShS, HYP and GhS descriptions suggest the actual posture used was a headstand.)	Legs-Up-the-Wall	
Viparita Virabhadrasana	विपरीतवीरभद्रासन	Reversed Warrior (Note: This is a well-documented example of a post-Light on Yoga (1966) pose, created as a variation of the 20th century Warrior poses. Hundreds of less common variations of other poses have been created in the same time frame.)	Standing			21st C. PL		
Virabhadrasana I	वीरभद्रासन	Warrior I	Standing			20th C. TK		
Virabhadrasana II	वीरभद्रासन II	Warrior II	Standing			20th C. TK		
Virabhadrasana III	वीरभद्रासन III	Warrior III	Standing			20th C. TK		
Virasana, Dhyana Virasana	वीरासन, ध्यान वीरासन	Hero, Hero's Meditation	Kneeling		Meditation	4th C. DU; 8th C. PSV (these may refer to a different meditation pose)		
Vrikshasana	वृक्षासन	Tree	Standing, Balancing			17th C. GhS		
Vrischikasana	वृश्चिकासन	Scorpion	Inversion	Backbend		20th C. LoY (13th - 18th C. in Bharatnatyam dance statues of Eastern Gopuram, Nataraja Temple, Chidambaram but not yoga)		Variant with one leg bent
Yoganidrasana; Pasini Mudra	योगनिद्रासन	Yogic sleep Noose Mudra	Reclining	Forward bend		17th C. HR 3.70; 17th C. GhS 3.84 as a Mudra; 18th C. painting, Mysore		

== See also ==
- Mudra – yoga gestures
- Pranayama – yoga breathing techniques
- Surya Namaskar – a foundational sequence of asanas

== Sources ==
- Ayyangar, T. R. Srinivasa (trans.) (1938). The Yoga Upanishads. Adyar, Madras: The Adyar Library.
- Bernard, Theos (2007) [1944]. Hatha yoga : the report of a personal experience. Edinburgh: Harmony. ISBN 978-0-9552412-2-2. OCLC 230987898.
- Goldberg, Elliott (2016). The Path of Modern Yoga : the history of an embodied spiritual practice. Rochester, Vermont: Inner Traditions. ISBN 978-1-62055-567-5. OCLC 926062252.
- Iyengar, B. K. S. (1979) [1966]. Light on Yoga: Yoga Dipika. Thorsons. ISBN 978-1855381667.
- Krishnamacharya, Tirumalai (2006) [1934]. Yoga Makaranda. Translated by Lakshmi Ranganathan; Nandini Ranganathan.
- Larson, Gerald James; Bhattacharya, Ram Shankar (2008). Yoga : India's Philosophy of Meditation. Motilal Banarsidass. ISBN 978-81-208-3349-4.
- Lidell, Lucy, The Sivananda Yoga Centre (1983). The book of yoga. Ebury. ISBN 978-0-85223-297-2. OCLC 12457963.
- Mallinson, James (2004). The Gheranda Samhita: the original Sanskrit and an English translation. YogaVidya. ISBN 978-0-9716466-3-6.
- Mallinson, James; Singleton, Mark (2017). Roots of Yoga. Penguin Classics. London: Penguin Books. ISBN 978-0-241-25304-5. OCLC 928480104.
- Mehta, Silva; Mehta, Mira; Mehta, Shyam (1990). Yoga: The Iyengar Way. Dorling Kindersley. ISBN 978-0863184208.
- Murugan, Chillayah (20 October 2012). "Yoga Asanas for Health and Fitness". Silambam. Archived from the original on 3 October 2015.
- Powers, Sarah (2008). Insight Yoga. Shambhala. ISBN 978-1-59030-598-0. OCLC 216937520.
- Saraswati, Swami Satyananda (1996). Asana Pranayama Mudra Bandha (PDF). Yoga Publications Trust. ISBN 978-8186336144. Archived from the original (PDF) on 2015-08-07.
- Sriharisukesh, N.; Pailoor, Subramanya (2019). "A review of asanas referenced in ancient texts and a brief comparative study of selected asanas" (PDF). International Journal of Sanskrit Research. 5 (4). ISSN 2394-7519.
- Srinivasa, Narinder (2002). Gharote, M. L.; Devnath, Parimal; Jha, Vijay Kant (eds.). Hatha Ratnavali Srinivasayogi | A Treatise On Hathayoga (1st ed.). Lonavla, India: The Lonavla Yoga Institute. ISBN 81-901176-96.
- Singleton, Mark (2010). Yoga Body : the origins of modern posture practice. Oxford University Press. ISBN 978-0-19-539534-1. OCLC 318191988.
- Sjoman, Norman E. (1999). The Yoga Tradition of the Mysore Palace. Abhinav Publications. ISBN 81-7017-389-2.
