= Darshana Upanishad =

Sanskrit text, Yoga Upanishad

Darshana
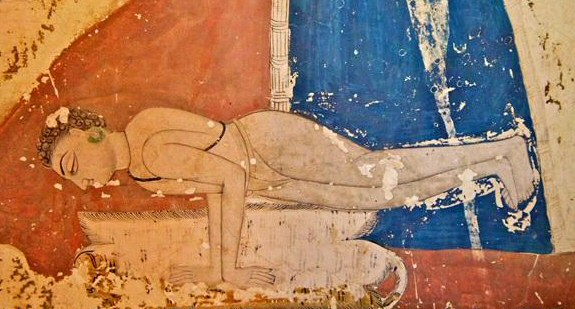
- Mayurasana is one of eight postures described in Darshana Upanishad. Mural painting at Mahamandir temple, Jodhpur, India, c. 1810
- Devanagari: दर्शन
- IAST: Darśana
- Title means: View, Meet
- Type: Yoga
- Linked Veda: Samaveda
- Chapters: 10
- Philosophy: Yoga, Vedanta

The Darshana Upanishad (Sanskrit: दर्शन उपनिषत्, IAST: Darśana Upaniṣad) is one of the minor Upanishads of Hinduism written in Sanskrit. It is one of twenty Yoga Upanishads in the four Vedas, and it is attached to the Samaveda.

The text presents classical Yoga similar to the Patanjali's Yogasutras-style format in a sequential ascending eight yogic stages, but unlike Yogasutras, the Darshana Upanishad includes kundalini concepts. The ultimate goal of Yoga, states the Upanishad, is self-knowledge and realizing the identity of one's Self (Atman) with the Universal Reality (Brahman).

== History ==
The text is a modern work composed by Upaniṣadbrahmayogin in the 18th century, drawing on verses from the second khaṇḍa of the Sūtasaṃhitā.

This Upanishad is also referred to as Yoga Darshana Upanishad, and Darśanopaniṣad (दर्शनोपनिषत्). It is listed at number 90 in the serial order of the Muktika enumerated by Rama to Hanuman in the modern era anthology of 108 Upanishads.

== Contents ==
The Upanishad is structured into ten sections (or chapters) of unequal length with two hundred and nine verses. The text is structured as a discourse by Hindu god Dattatreya to sage Sankriti on Yoga.

The text presents a fusion of Hatha Yoga and eight limbed Patanjali Yogasutras methodology, on a foundation of Vedanta and Yoga philosophies. The first and second chapters describe ethics of a Yogi, as necessary for success in Yoga. Many asanas (yogic postures) are mentioned, and nine explained in chapter 3. Chapter 4 asserts that god (Shiva) is within the temple of one's body, and the best pilgrimage is something one can make daily to this inner world. Some subsections in chapter 5 discuss its theory of blood vessels and inner energy flows, along with techniques for inner cleansing. One of the largest chapters is dedicated to breathing exercises, while the last four chapters describe steps for concentration, introspection, meditation, self-knowledge and ultimately union of the Self (Atman) with the Absolute Reality (Brahman).

Non-violence: the first rule of Yoga

वेदोक्तेन प्रकारेण विना सत्यं तपोधन । कायेन मनसा वाचा हिंसाऽहिंसा न चान्यथा ॥ आत्मा सर्वगतोऽच्छेद्यो न ग्राह्य इति मे मतिः । स चाहिंसा वरा प्रोक्ता मुने वेदान्तवेदिभिः ॥

Verily, the non-indulgence in violence by body, mind or word of mouth, in accord with Vedic injunctions is non-violence: not otherwise. O sage! the firm belief that the Atman pervades all, is indivisible and inaccessible to the senses. That is said to be the best basis of non-violence by those who know Vedanta.

— Darshana Upanishad 1.7-1.8

The first chapter of the Upanishad has 25 verses describing the Yamas or virtuous restraints; the second chapter with 16 verses lists the Niyamas or virtuous disciplines; the third chapter's 13 verses gives explanation on the yogic Asanas or exercise postures; while the fourth chapter, which is the longest, has 63 verses on its theory of the human body, the nadis or the blood vessels.

Asanas in Darshana Upanishad
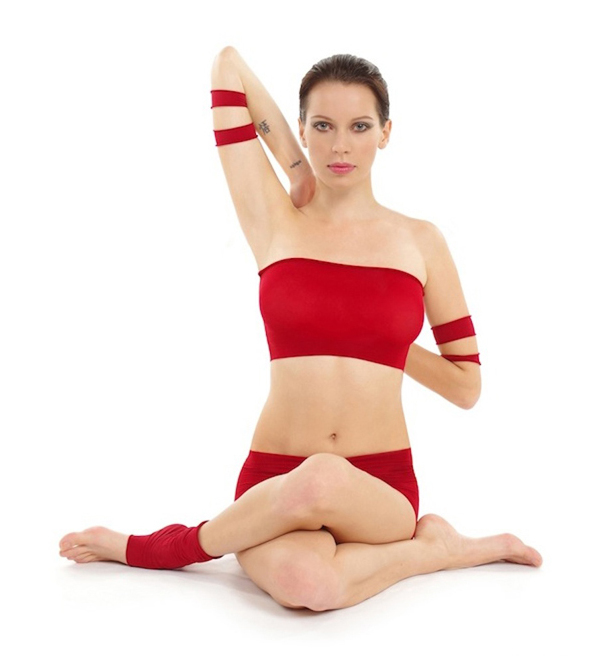
Gomukhasana

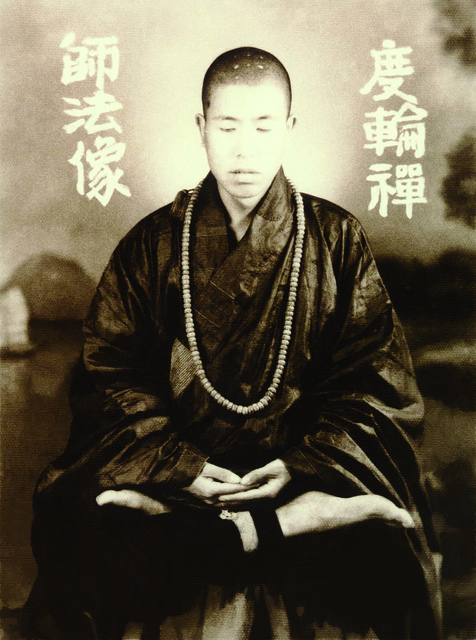
Lotus position or Padmasana

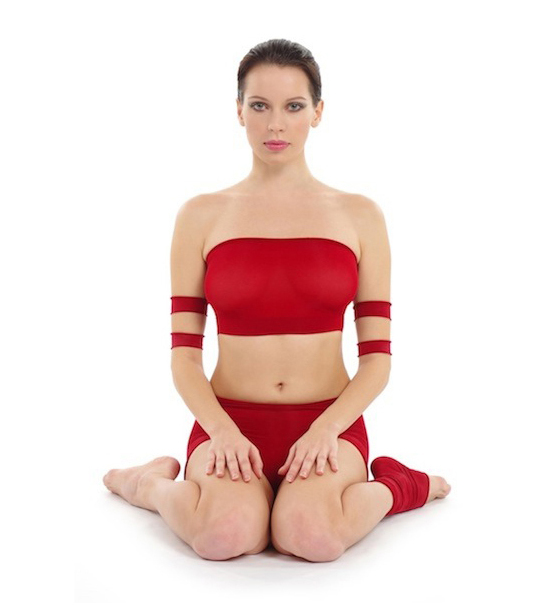
Virasana

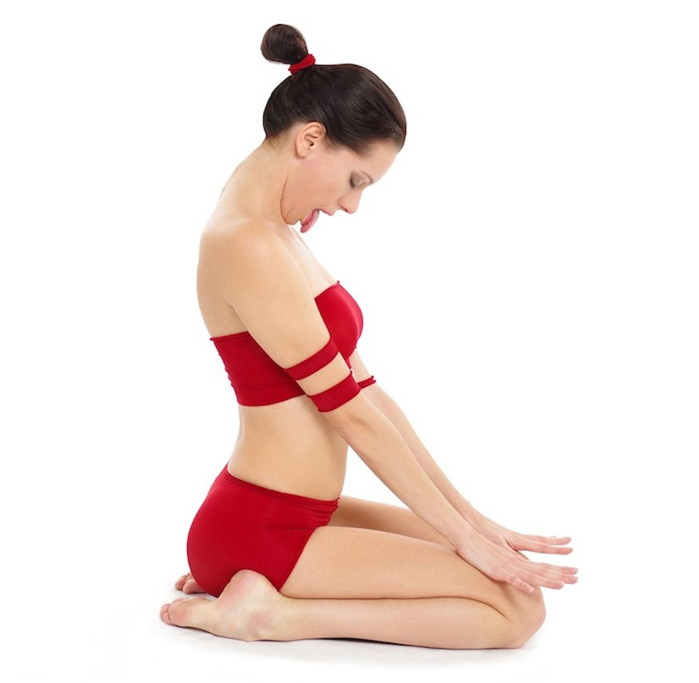
Simhasana
The text describes the following yoga Asana Svastikasana, Gomukhasana, Padmasana, Virasana, Simhasana, Bhadrasana, Muktasana, Mayurasana and Sukhasana.

The fifth chapter's 14 verses is a further elaboration on the previous section giving detailed procedure for inner cleansing or purification; the sixth chapter with 51 verses elaborates on Pranayama or breath exercises; the seventh chapter through its 14 verses explains Pratyahara or the ability to withdrawal senses from the external world; the eighth chapter with nine verses on concentration or Dharana; the ninth chapter has six verses describing meditation or Dhyana; and the last chapter in its 12 slokas deals with the samadhi stage of yoga which is attained when the Yogin realizes "the Atman (Self) is identical with Brahman". The text enunciates esoteric theories comparing the human body and blood veins with the terrestrial features of the earth such as river channels with their sacred fjords.

The text is notable for presenting its ideas inclusively with some sections opening or closing with praises for Hindu gods Vishnu, Shiva, Brahma, Dattatreya or Shakti Devis, but the core of text is techniques discussed in nontheistic terminology and Vedantic. The axiology in the text includes a discussion of the value of Yamas and Niyamas, such as non-violence, truthfulness, compassion, abstinence from anger, temperance in food (Mitahara), among others. The text details yogic postures such as Svastikasana, Gomukhasana, Padmasana, Virasana, Simhasana, Bhadrasana, Muktasana, Mayurasana and Sukhasana. These Asanas are discussed in various breathing and cleansing exercises in later sections. The Upanishad thereafter proceeds to presenting its Vedantic ideas on meditation and nondualism, stating its premise in verse 7.13-7.14, that the Yogin should ascertain his Atman (Self) in the "nondual, cosmic Atman" (Brahman, unchanging, ultimate reality).

== See also ==
- Hatha yoga
- Yoga (philosophy)
- Yogatattva Upanishad
- Yoga Vasistha
