= Yoga for children =

Form of yoga as exercise

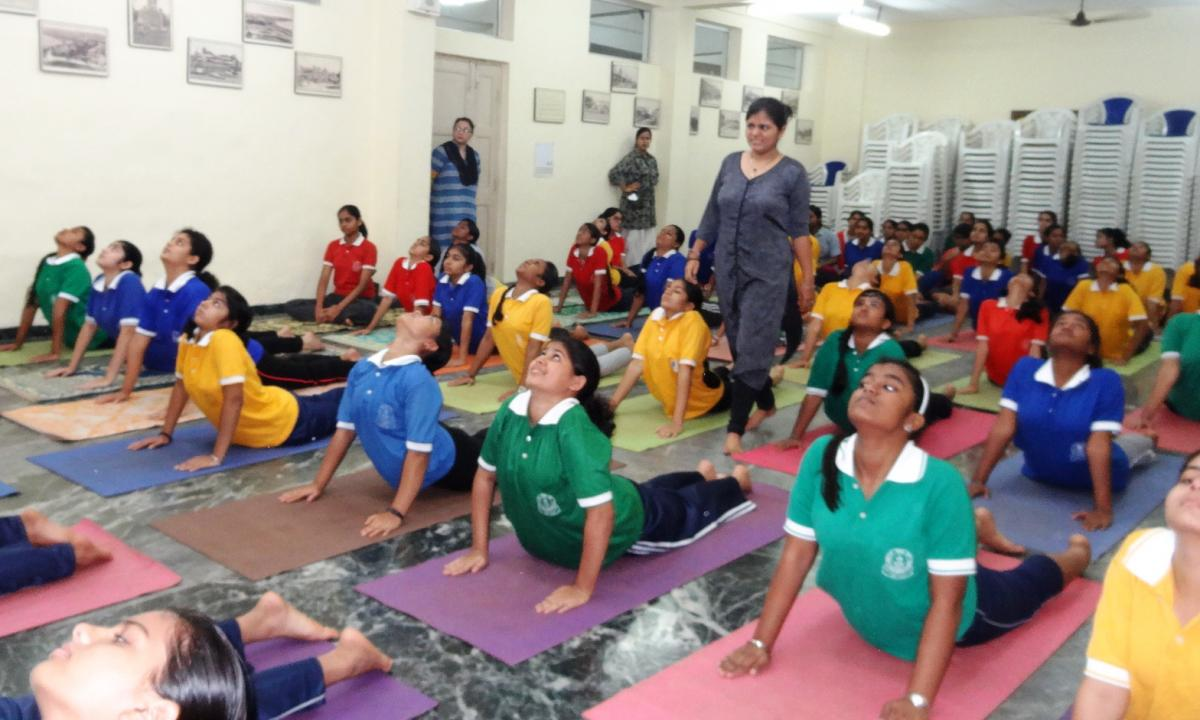
Children perform cobra pose at the Naval Children School, Mumbai in 2015.

Yoga for children is a form of yoga as exercise designed for children. It includes poses to increase strength, flexibility, and coordination. Classes are intended to be fun and may include age-appropriate games, animal sounds and creative names for poses.

== Approach ==
Montessori and Kundalini Yoga teacher and teacher trainer Shakta Khalsa began to teach yoga to children in the 1970s, in a Kundalini community. She states that the approach is not "just a scaled-down version of yoga for adults—it's a whole different animal." She taught asanas using simple descriptions: Downward Dog pose by getting the class to make the shape of a mountain, and Virabhadrasana by asking them to be "fearless warriors". She led children into pranayama with breath-awareness exercises like blowing on a feather and noticing the different feelings that came when you blew hard or gently. She discovered that the teacher had to avoid even basic terms like "inhale" and "exhale" if the children didn't know those words. In 1998 she published an early guide to children's yoga, Fly Like a Butterfly.

Marsha Wenig, founder of YogaKids International, has developed yoga sessions with videos suitable for children aged 3 to 6. She agrees that the teaching methods are necessarily quite different from those used to teach adults. The benefits may be "stillness, balance, flexibility, focus, peace, grace, connection, health, and well-being" but the challenge for the teacher is to hold the class's attention. She encourages children to "bark in the dog pose, hiss in the cobra, and meow in cat stretch." Her experiences led to a 2003 book describing the methods that she developed.

== Health benefits ==
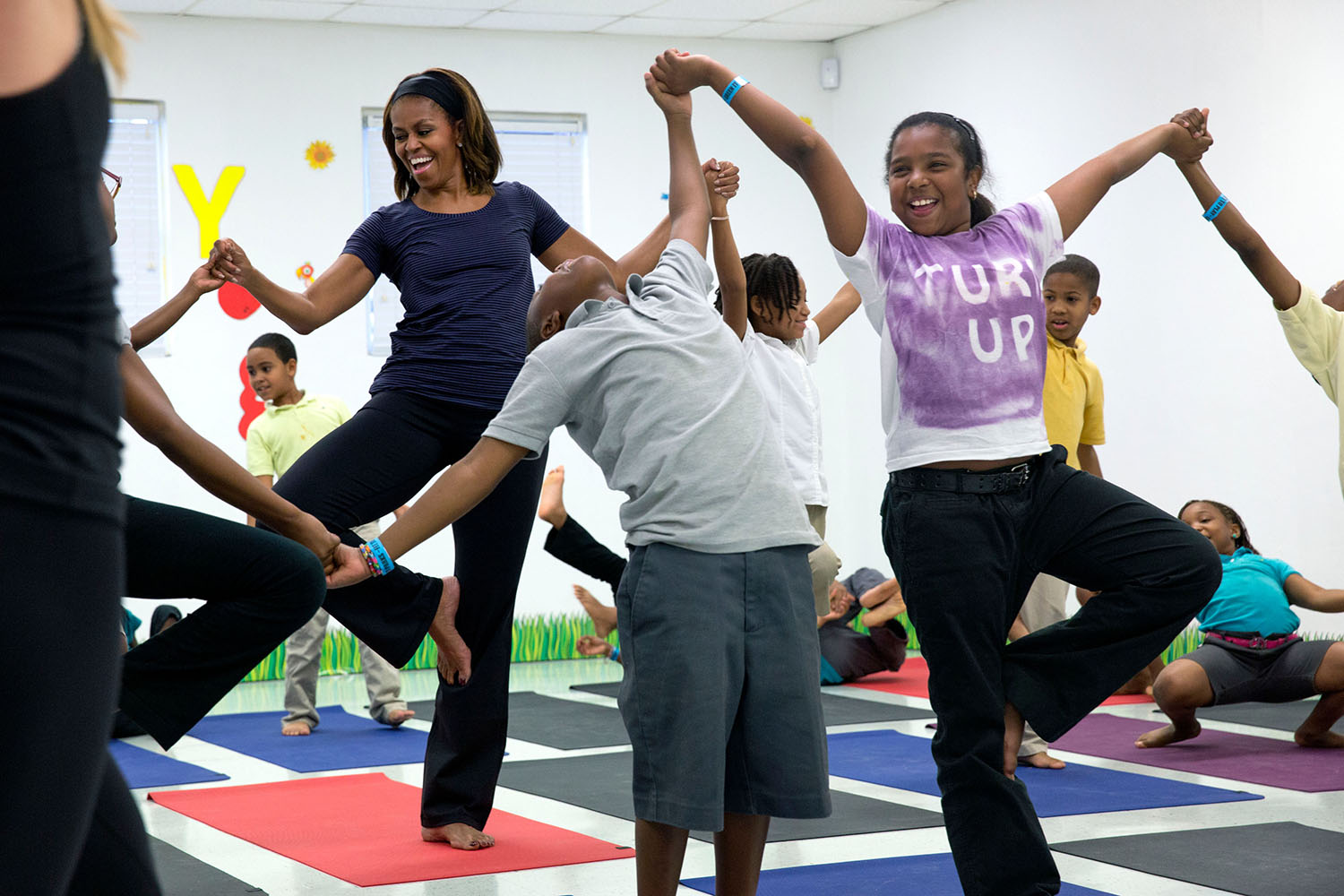
Michelle Obama joins children for a yoga class during a "Let's Move!" after school activities event, 2014.

The benefits for children are similar to those for adults. Emotional benefits include greater optimism and a less reactive nature. Mental benefits including increased focus, concentration and improvements in the quality of sleep have been reported.

Academic performance improves, along with confidence in physical abilities. Yoga is used for the treatment of children with special needs, and to aid conventional medical treatment. Yoga practice helps to protect boys from increases in negative behavior.

Physical benefits include increased flexibility, improved coordination and balance, and increased core and body strength. Mental benefits include stronger mind–body connection, increased self-esteem, better focus and concentration, and increased ability to relax and cope with stressful situations. Social and emotional benefits include more awareness of self and others, and increased skill in problem solving and conflict resolution.

== Issues ==
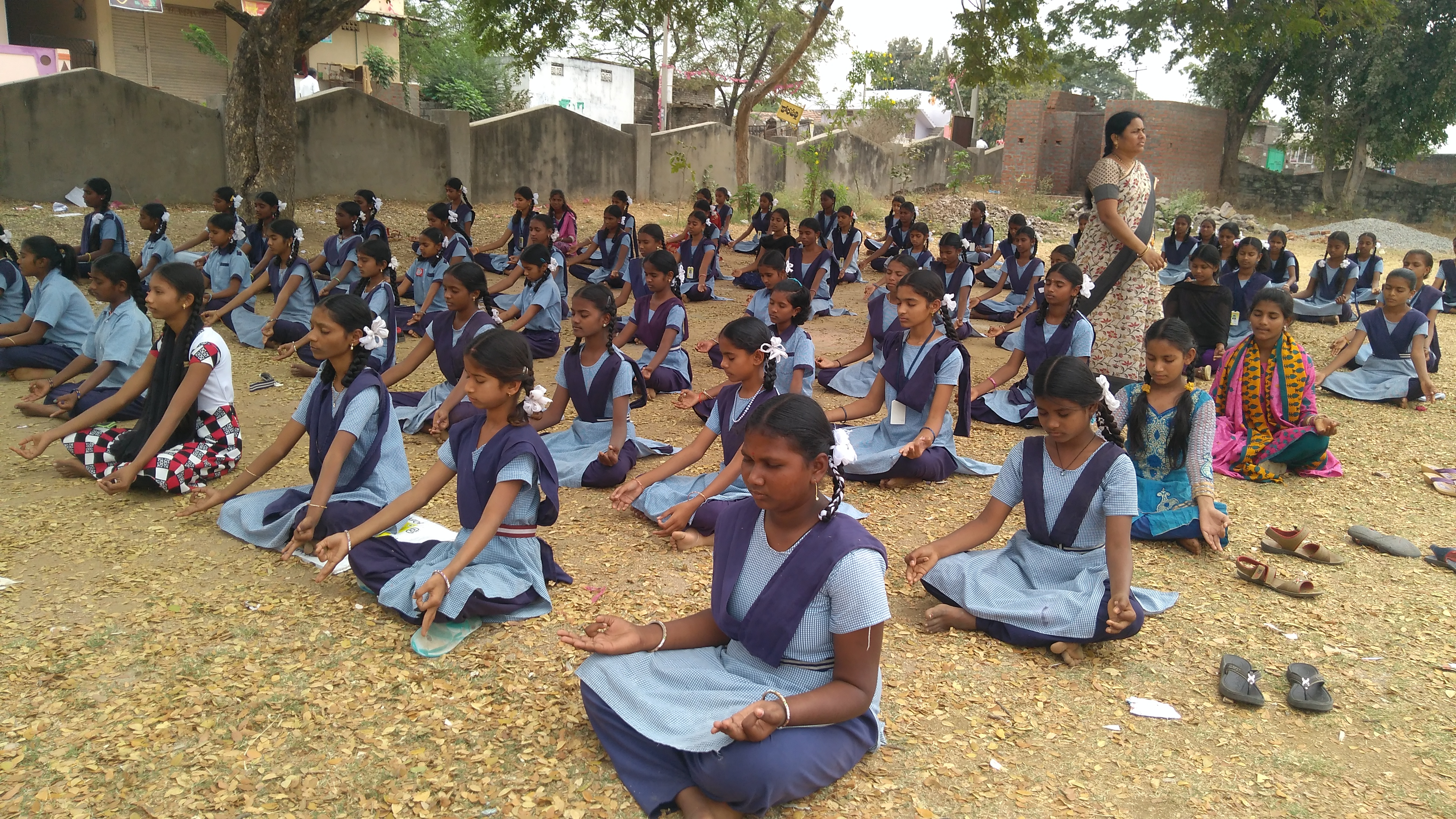
A school class in India celebrating the International Day of Yoga, 2018

Some parents are worried by yoga's religious associations, believing that yoga is an offshoot of Hinduism. Yoga teachers accordingly sometimes avoid Sanskrit pose names, for instance saying cat/cow instead of Bidalasana, tree for Vrikshasana, and bridge for Setubandhasana. The yoga teacher and education researcher Andrea Hyde however states that yoga is not a religion and can fit into ordinary school curriculums, whatever the prevailing culture.

== Sources ==
- Khalsa, Shakta (1998). Fly Like a Butterfly : yoga for children. Rudra Press. ISBN 978-0-915801-84-8. OCLC 39223620.
- Wenig, Marsha (2003). Yogakids : educating the whole child through yoga. Stewart, Tabori & Chang. ISBN 978-1-58479-292-5. OCLC 51553409.
