= Joga Pradīpikā =

1731 Indian yoga text

The Joga Pradīpikā (जोगप्रदीपिका, "A Small Light on Yoga") is a hatha yoga text by Ramanandi Jayatarama written in 1737 in a mixture of Hindi, Braj Bhasa, Khari Boli and forms close to Sanskrit. It presents 6 cleansing methods, 84 asanas, 24 mudras and 8 kumbhakas. The text is illustrated in an 1830 manuscript with 84 paintings of asanas, prepared about a hundred years after the text.

== Topics ==
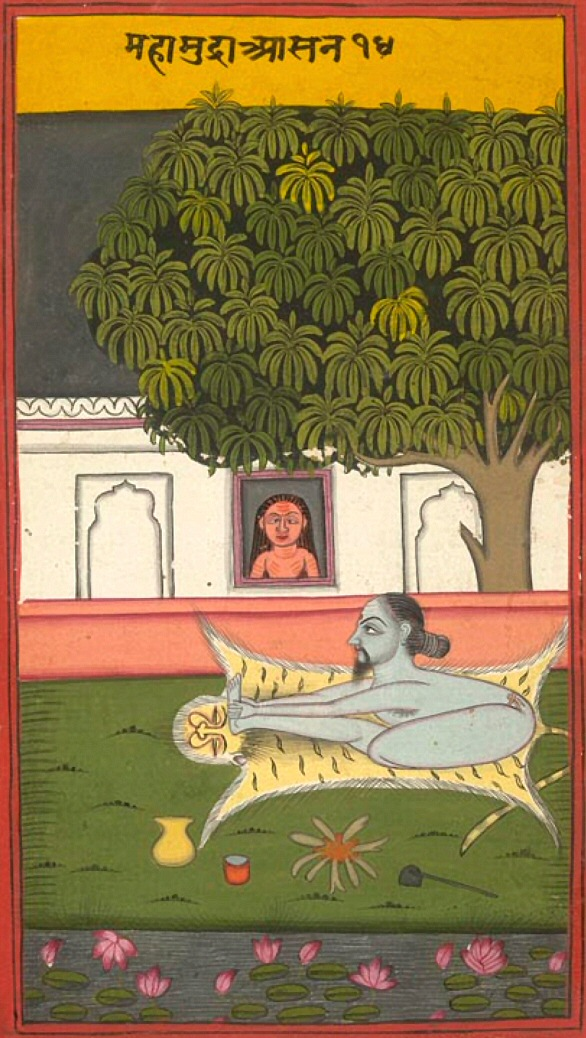
Mahāmudrā is listed among the text's asanas, thus conflating mudras with asanas.

The Joga Pradīpikā covers a broad range of topics on yoga, including the nature of the yogic subtle body, preliminary purifications, yogic seals (mudrās), asanas, prānāyāma (breath-control), mantras, meditation, liberation (moksha), and samādhi.

One of the purifications in the text is the mulashishnasodhana, "the cleansing of the anus and the penis", which calls for water to be drawn into the anus and squirted out through the penis, which James Mallinson and Mark Singleton gloss as "a feat which is, of course, anatomically impossible."

Prānāyāma is stated to result in liberation, on its own, though some of its breath-control techniques also use mantras. The Joga Pradīpikā however asks the yogi to stay on as a physical body to serve the Lord, rather than choosing liberation.

The Joga Pradīpikā conflates the mudrās with asanas by describing the mahāmudrā as one of its 84 asanas. Like other late texts, it describes a relatively large number of mudrās, 24 in all.

On meditation, the text reworks the Bhagavata Purana's meditation of the goddess Sītā and the god Rāma. On samādhi, the yogi reaches it by the "bee cave" in the sahasrara chakra, the "thousand-petalled lotus", with an unending "unstruck sound".

== Asanas ==
The description of 84 asanas occupies 314 out of 964 verses in the 1737 version. Most of the asanas are said to bring therapeutic benefits; all of them ask the practitioner to direct the gaze (drishti) at the point between the eyebrows or at the end of the nose.

The 84 asanas described and illustrated in the 1830 document include some that are widely practised in modern yoga, but its selection differs markedly from that in other hatha yoga texts such as the Hatha Ratnavali. Many of the illustrated poses are seated asanas used for meditation, including the ancient Padmasana and Siddhasana, both of which appear twice in the set of illustrations. The number 84 is symbolic rather than literal, indicating that a set is complete and sacred. (Note: 84's symbolism may derive from its astrological and numerological properties: it is the product of 7, the number of planets in astrology, and 12, the number of signs of the zodiac, while in numerology, 7 is the sum of 3 and 4, and 12 is the product, i.e. 84 is (3+4)×(3×4).)

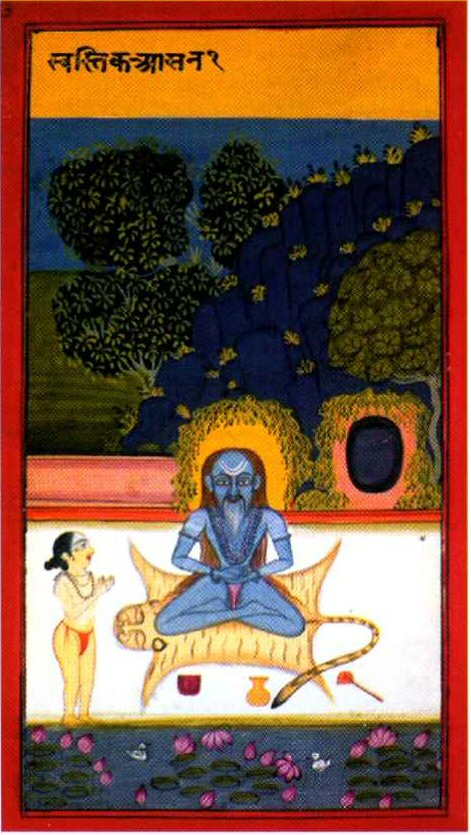
1 Svastikasana

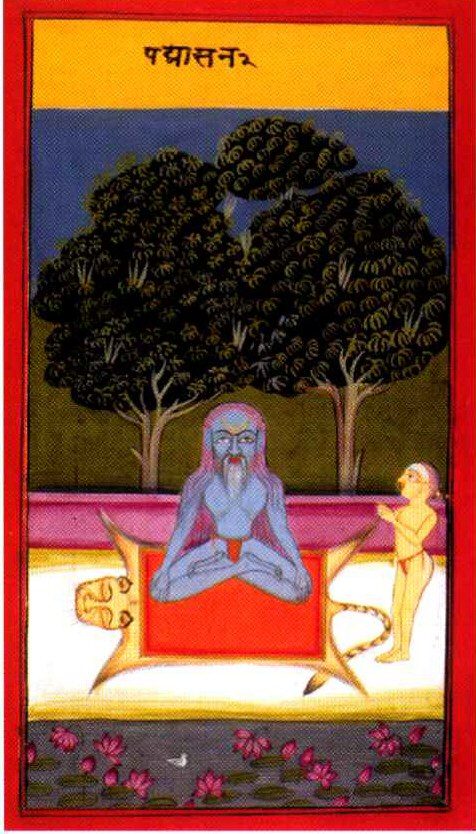
2 Padmasana

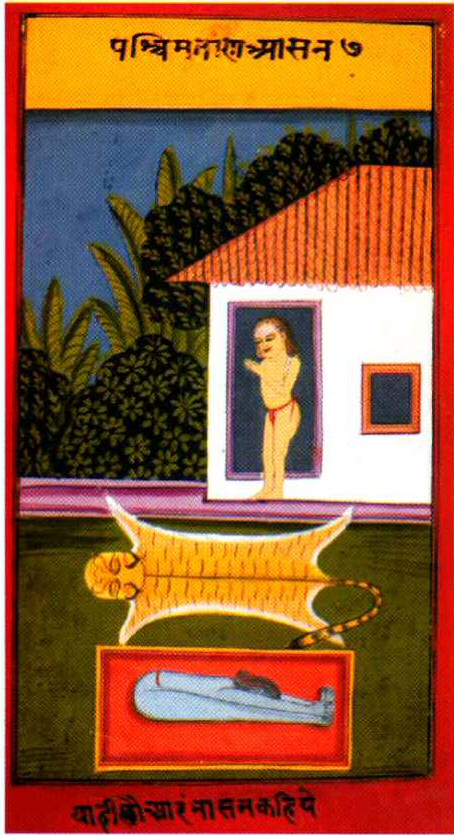
7 Paschimottanasana

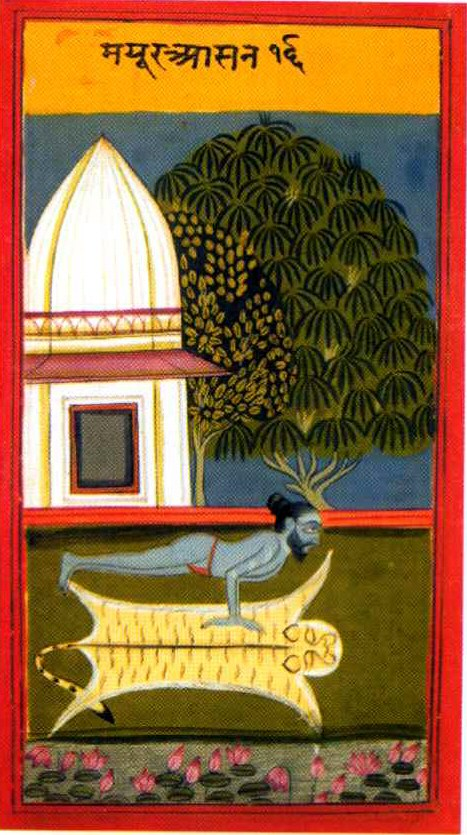
16 Mayurasana

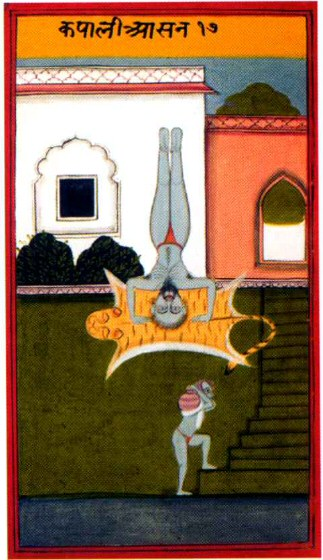
17 Kapali asana

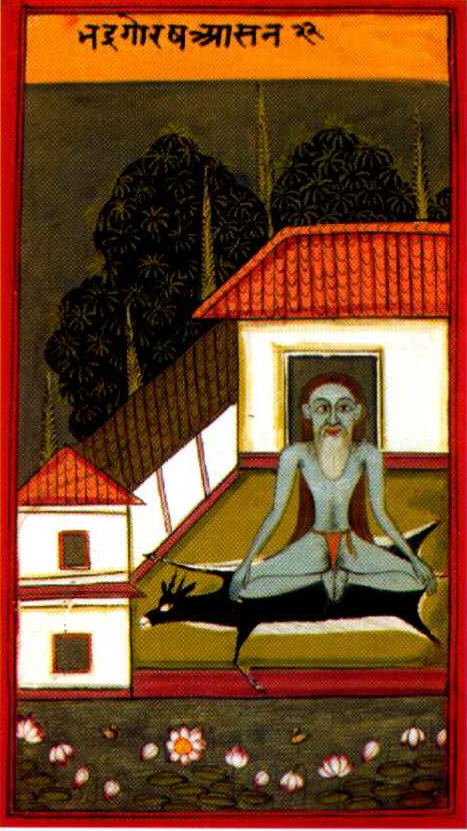
22 Gorakshasana

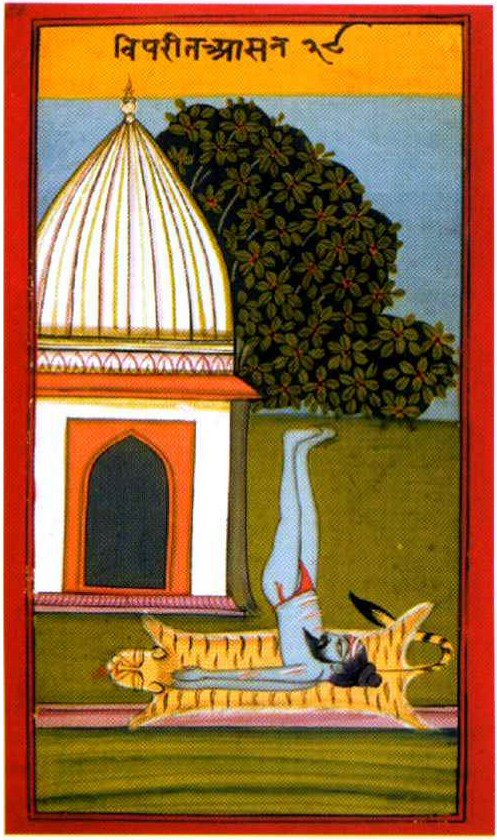
29 Viparita Karani

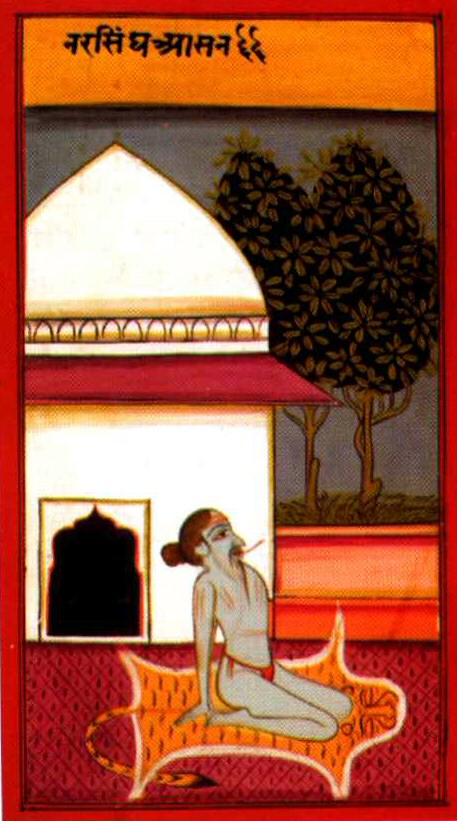
66 Narasimhasana

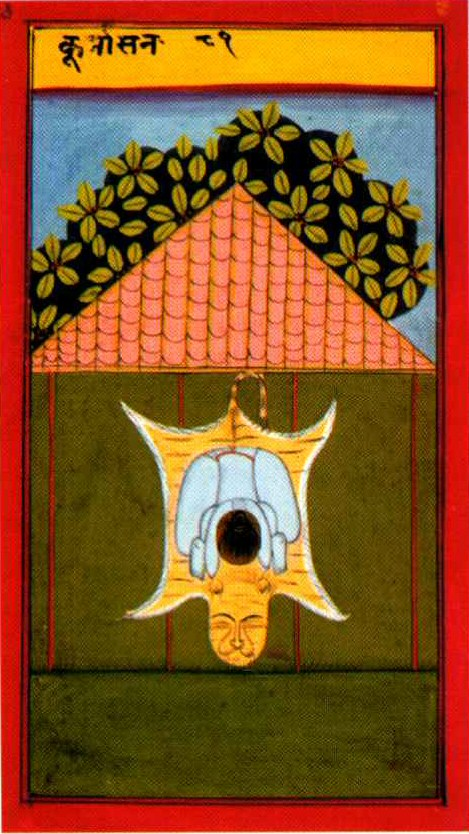
81 Kurmasana

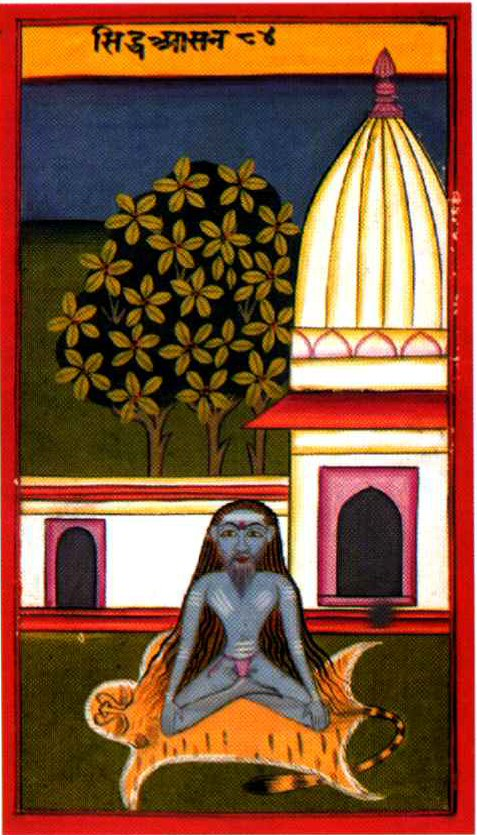
84 Siddhasana

== Sources ==
- Bühnemann, Gudrun (2007). Eighty-Four Asanas in Yoga: A Survey of Traditions. New Delhi: D. K. Printworld. pp. 38–63. ISBN 978-8124604175.
- Jayataramā, Ramanandi (1999). Gharote, M. L. (ed.). Jogpradīpikā of Jayataramā. Jodhpur, Rajasthan, India: Rajasthan Oriental Research Institute.
- Mallinson, James (2011). "Haṭha Yoga". In Knut A. Jacobsen; et al. (eds.). Brill Encyclopedia of Hinduism. Vol. 3. Brill Academic. pp. 770–781. ISBN 978-90-04-27128-9.
- Mallinson, James; Singleton, Mark (2017). Roots of Yoga. Penguin Books. ISBN 978-0-241-25304-5. OCLC 928480104.
