= Utkatasana =

Standing posture in hatha yoga

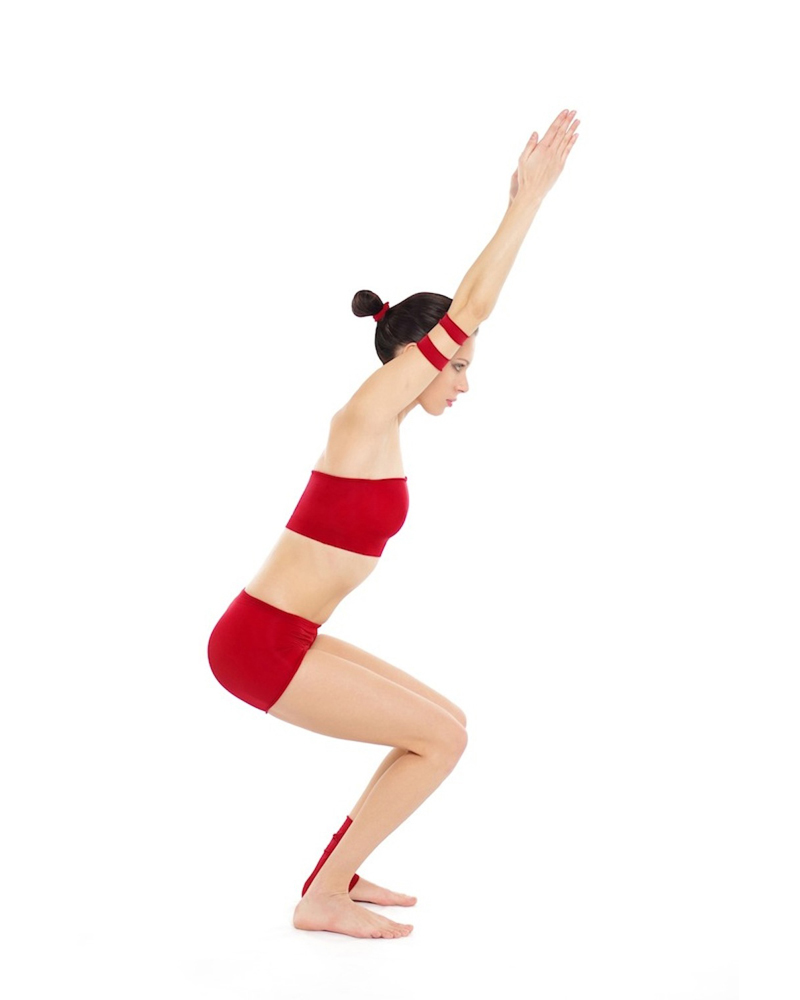
Utkatasana

Utkatasana (Sanskrit: उत्कटासन; IAST: Utkaṭāsana), Chair Pose, or fierce pose, is a standing asana in modern yoga as exercise. It was a low squatting asana in medieval hatha yoga.

== Etymology and origins ==
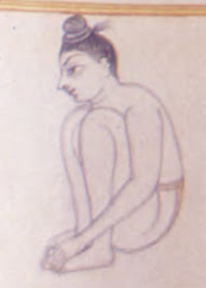
Utkatasana shown as a squatting pose in the 19th century Sritattvanidhi

The name comes from the Sanskrit words utkaṭa (उत्कट) meaning "wild, frightening, above the usual, intense, gigantic, furious, or heavy", and āsana (आसन) meaning "posture" or "seat".

The modern chair-like pose is said to originate with Krishnamacharya. An older version of the pose, with the yogin squatting lower down on to the heels in a posture close to Upaveshasana, is shown in the 19th century Sritattvanidhi.

== Description ==
In Utkatasana, the knees are hips-width apart and bent. The hips are back, and the chest is forward. Both arms are above the head, in line with the ears. The spine is elongated, and the sternum is lifted. This pose is shaped like a lightning bolt and is said to be powerful and stimulating.

== Variations ==
Ardha Utkatasana has the knees bent closer to a right angle so the thighs are more nearly parallel to the floor, and the body is inclined forwards closer to the thighs.

Parivritta Utkatasana is the rotated variant; the hands are pressed together in front of the chest in Anjali Mudra, the lower elbow is pressed against the outside of the opposite knee, and the gaze is directed upwards.

Utkata Konasana, Goddess Pose, has the legs wide apart, the feet turned outwards in line with the thighs, and the knees bent. The arms are usually raised with the elbows bent; variants have the arms straight up, or the hands may be held in Añjali Mudrā, prayer position in front of the chest.

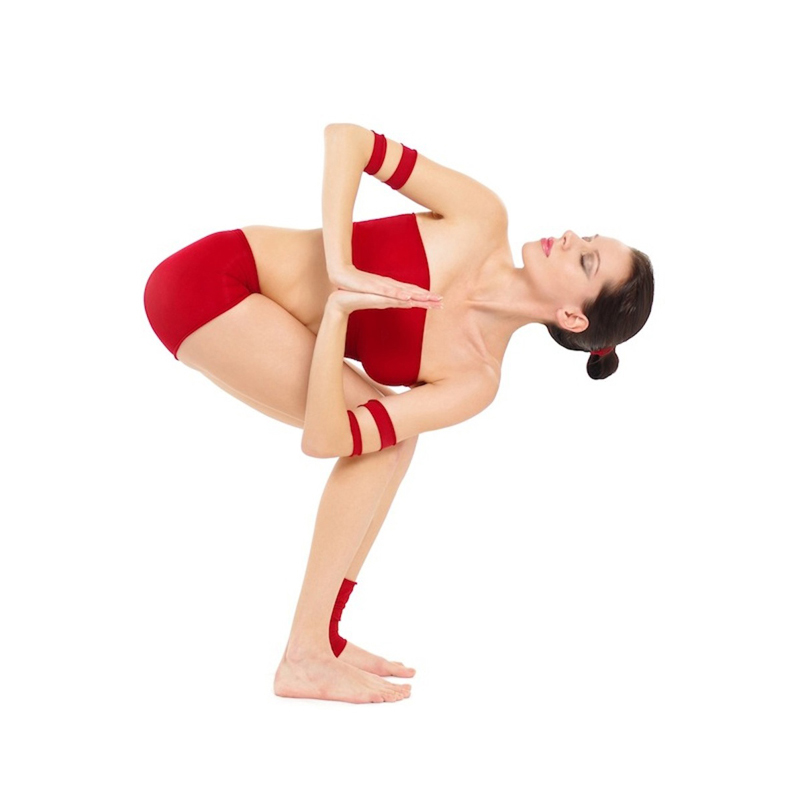
Parivritta Utkatasana with the hands in Anjali Mudra

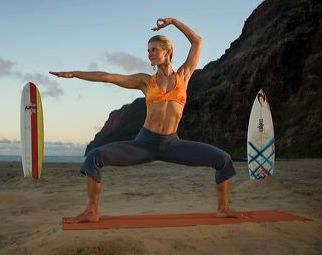
Shiva Rea demonstrating Utkata Konasana with a hand mudra

== See also ==
- Pashasana, another squatting pose
