= Vimanarcanakalpa =

Ancient Text

The Vimānārcanākalpa is a 10th- to 11th-century text on Hatha yoga, attributed to the sage Marichi.

== Text ==
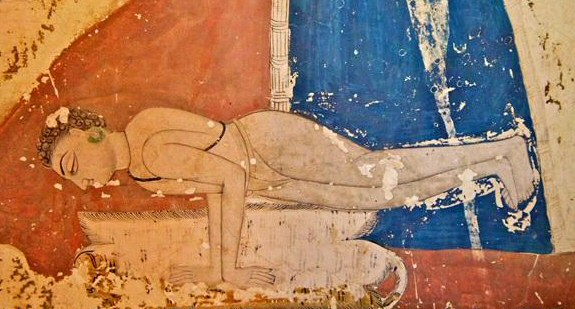
The Vimanarcanakalpa is the first text to define a non-seated asana, Mayurasana. Mahamandir mural, Jodhpur, c. 1810

The Vimanarcanakalpa is a 10th- to 11th-century prose text on Hatha yoga, attributed to the sage Marichi. It states that yoga is the union of the individual with the supreme self.

It is one of the earliest texts to describe a non-seated asana and to call such postures asanas (the term originally and literally meaning a seat), namely Mayurasana the peacock pose. In chapter 96 it describes nine asanas in all (Brahmasana, Svastikasana, Padmasana, Gomukhasana, Simhasana, Muktasana, Virasana, (Note: Called hero's posture, but as a cross-legged pose not the same as the modern kneeling Virasana.) Bhadrasana, and Mayurasana), some 500 years before the Hatha Yoga Pradipika. Its account of Mayurasana, in James Mallinson's translation, is:

Fix the palms of the hands on the floor, place the elbows on either side of the navel, raise the head and feet and remain in the air like a staff. This is the peacock posture.

The text teaches a method of pratyahara, withdrawal using the breath, which is raised through 18 stages called marmans, vital points.

The Vimanarcanakalpa describes other topics, such as the practice of burying sacred bronze objects to protect them in times of trouble.

== Sources ==
=== Primary ===
- Marichi (1926) [c. 1000]. Vimanarcanakalpa (in Sanskrit).

=== Secondary ===
- Mallinson, James; Singleton, Mark (2017). Roots of Yoga. Penguin Books. ISBN 978-0-241-25304-5. OCLC 928480104.
