= Vasishtha Samhita =

Historic Hindu religious text

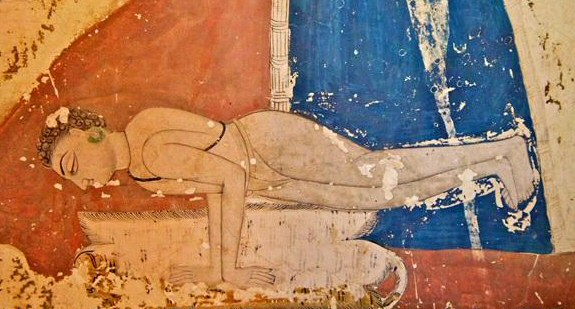
The Vasishtha Samhita describes non-seated poses such as Mayurasana. Mahamandir temple mural, Jodhpur, India, c. 1810

The Vasishtha Samhita (Sanskrit: वासिष्ठसंहिता, Vāsiṣṭha Saṁhitā, Vasishtha's Collection) is a 13th-century medieval Vaishnavite text, one of the first to describe non-seated hatha yoga asanas including the arm-balancing Kukkutasana, Cockerel Pose. It makes use of the 10th-century Vimanarcanakalpa, whose verse it paraphrases in prose to describe what may be the first non-seated asana, the arm-balancing Mayurasana, Peacock Pose. These descriptions in turn were exploited by the 15th century Hatha Yoga Pradipika.

The Vasishtha Samhita shares many verses with the Yoga Yajnavalkya, some of which originate in the earlier Padma Samhita.

The text, ascribed to the earlier sage Vasishtha, was compiled by an unknown author of the Vaishnavite Shakta sect. Its 45 chapters cover peace, name-chanting, offerings, sacrifices, astrology, and donation.

== Sources ==
- Mallinson, James; Singleton, Mark (2017). Roots of Yoga. Penguin Books. ISBN 978-0-241-25304-5. OCLC 928480104.
- Maheshananda, Swami; Sharma, B. R. (2005). Vasistha Samhita. Kaivalyadhama. ISBN 978-8189485375.
