= Gomukhasana =

Seated posture in hatha yoga

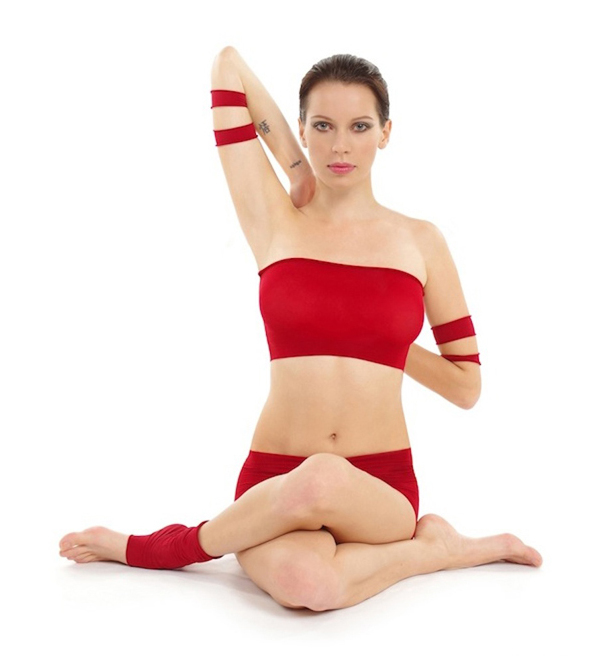
Gomukhasana

Gomukhasana (Sanskrit: गौमुखासन; IAST: Gomukhāsana) or Cow Face Pose is a seated asana in hatha yoga and modern yoga as exercise, sometimes used for meditation.

== Etymology and origins ==
The name comes from the Sanskrit गौ go meaning "cow", मुख mukha meaning "face" or "mouth", and आसन āsana meaning "posture" or "seat". The crossed legs are said to look like a cow's mouth, while the bent elbows supposedly look like a cow's ears.

The pose is ancient as it is described in the Darshana Upanishad (3.3–4), written around the 4th century. It is described within the 84 asanas in the 17th-century Haṭha Ratnāvalī (3.7–20). However, the current form of Gomukhasana with the hands behind the back is mentioned only in such ancient tantric texts as the Ahirbudhnya Samhita. It is sometimes used for meditation and pranayama.

== Description ==
The pose is entered from kneeling by crossing the legs; the heel of the upper leg is tucked in under the lower thigh near the buttock. The arm on the lower leg side is raised, the forearm bent down, while the other arm reaches down behind the back, the forearm bent up, so the hands can clasp between the shoulder blades.

The sitting position can be modified either by putting a folded blanket on the heels, and if need be also one beneath them.

The pose stretches the shoulders. The hand position can be modified using a strap to extend the reach for those who cannot bring the hands together behind the back. The pose is contra-indicated for people with a rotator cuff injury.

Preparatory poses for Gomukhasana include Baddha Konasana and Garudasana. Counter poses include Dandasana, Paschimottanasana, and Purvottanasana.

== See also ==
- List of asanas
