= Cat/Cow pose =

Kneeling posture in modern yoga

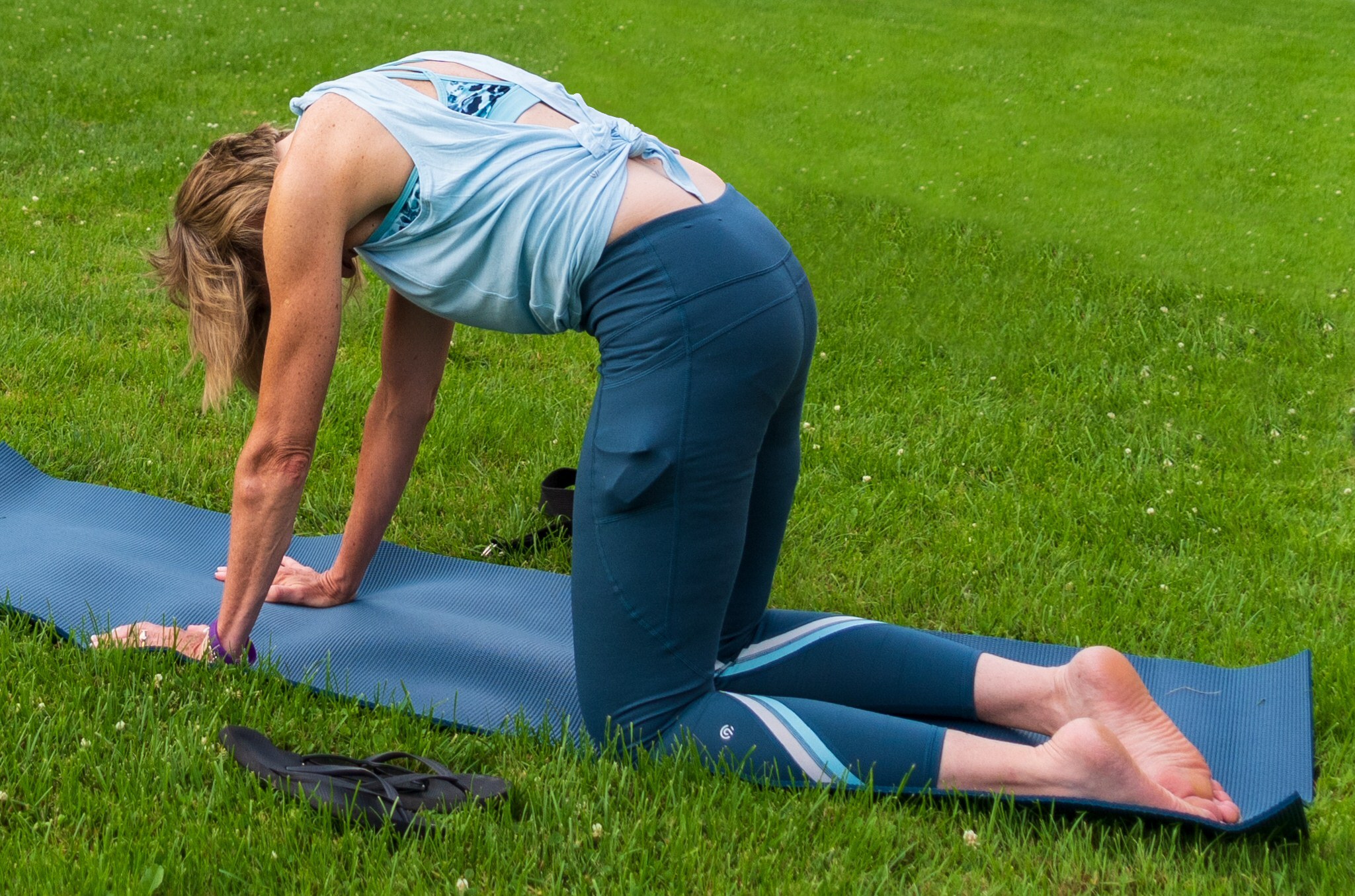
Bidalasana, or Cat Pose, at an outdoor yoga event

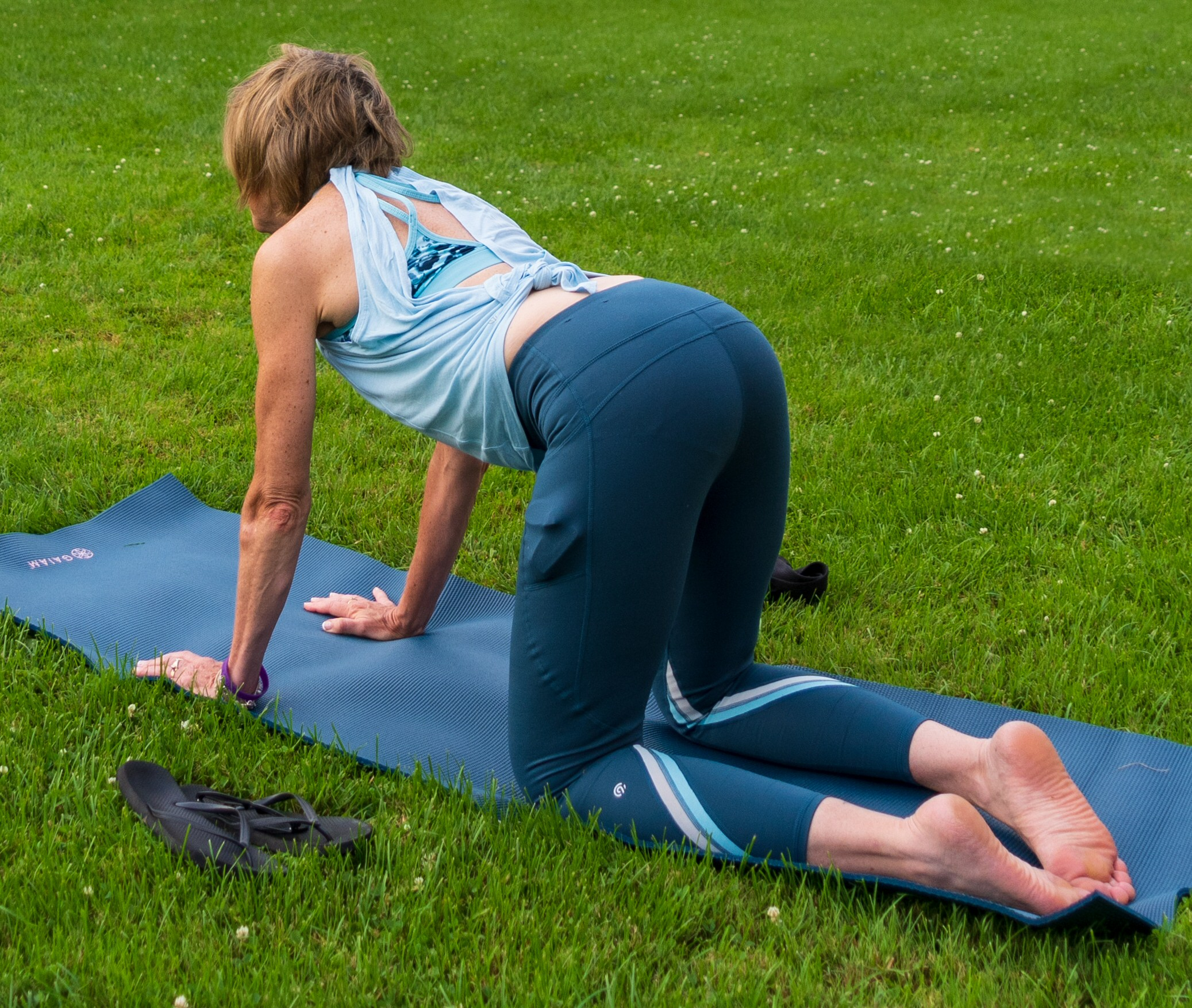
The counter-posture, Bitilasana, or Cow Pose

Cat/Cow is a pair of kneeling asanas in modern yoga as exercise. Cat pose is called Bidalasana (Sanskrit: बिडालासन; IAST: biḍālāsana) or Marjariasana (Sanskrit: मार्जरीआसन; IAST: mārjārīāsana) in Sanskrit. Cow Pose, the counter-posture, is called Bitilasana (Sanskrit: बितिलासन; IAST: bitilāsana) in Sanskrit. The widely used Cat/Cow exercise alternates between Cat and Cow poses repeatedly, providing a gentle flexing and extension of the spine.

A variant with one leg held up is Vyaghrasana (Sanskrit: व्याघ्रासन; IAST: vyaghrāsana), Tiger Pose; a similar variant with one leg held straight out is Chakravakasana (Sanskrit: चक्रवाकासन; IAST: cakravākāsana), Sunbird Pose.

== Etymology and origins ==
The name Bidalasana, बिडालासन, is from the Sanskrit बिडाल, biḍāl, meaning "cat", and āsana meaning "posture" or "seat". The alternative name Marjariasana (also written Marjaryasana), मार्जरीआसन, is similarly from मार्जरी, mārjārī, also meaning "cat". A similar pose was described in Niels Bukh's early 20th century Danish text Primary Gymnastics as "prone-kneeling position", which in turn was derived from a 19th-century Scandinavian tradition of gymnastics.

A different asana, Marjarottanasana, meaning upside-down cat stretch pose, is illustrated in the 19th century Sritattvanidhi.

A pose named Vyaghrasana or tiger pose is listed but not described in the 17th century Hatha Ratnavali.

== Description ==
The practitioner kneels on all fours and slowly raises and lowers the back, transitioning in a gentle vinyasa between Cat and Cow Poses, and exercising the core muscles that support the spine. Cat Pose flexes the spine; Cow Pose, where the belly and back are lowered and the hips and shoulders remain unmoved, extends the spine.

The pose is considered in Sivananda Yoga to be suitable for use during pregnancy.

== Variations ==
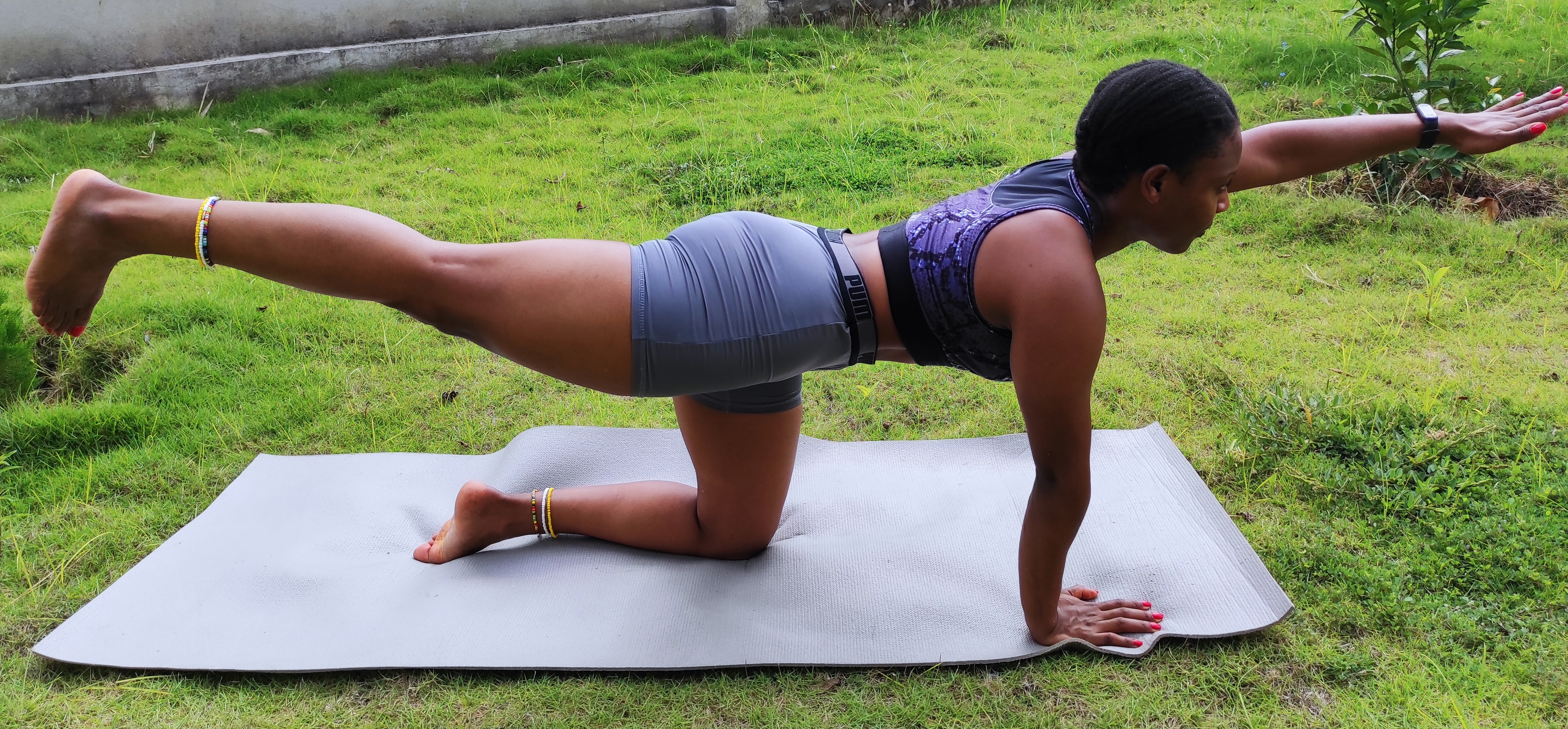
Chakravakasana, Sunbird Pose, with straight leg

In variations of the pose, one leg is stretched out straight, and the knee of the stretched out leg may then be bent so the foot points straight up; the opposite hand may also be stretched out in Vyaghrasana, Tiger Pose. The similar Chakravakasana, Sunbird Pose, has the leg and arm stretched out straight, horizontally.
