= Simhasana =

Kneeling posture in hatha yoga

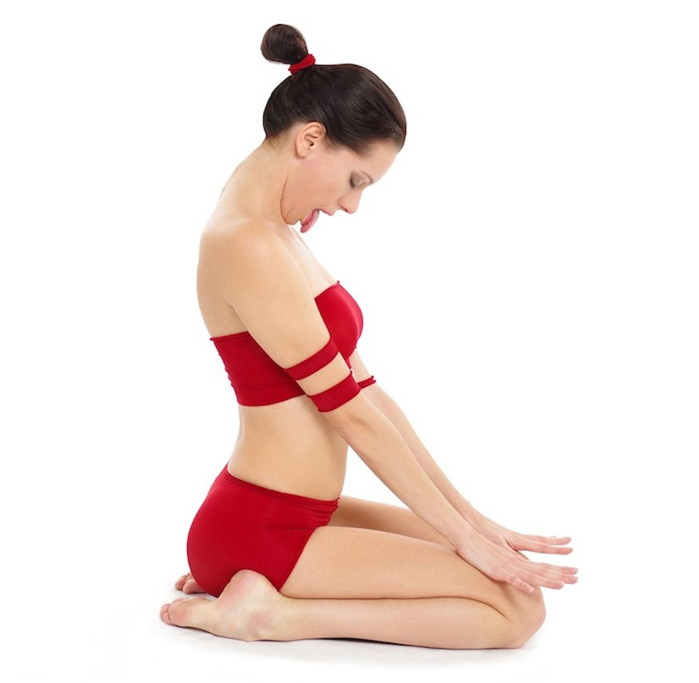
Simhasana

Simhasana (Sanskrit: सिंहासन; IAST: Siṁhāsana) or Lion Pose is an asana in hatha yoga and modern yoga as exercise.

== Etymology and origins ==
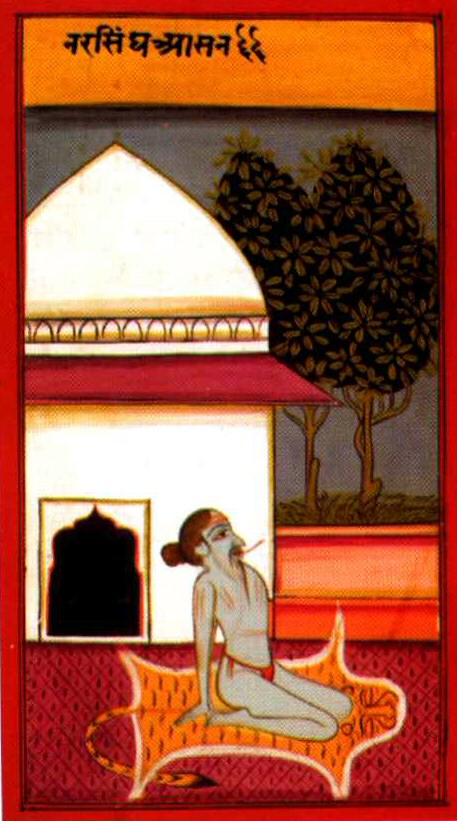
"Narasimhasana" from an illustrated manuscript of the Joga Pradipika, 1830

The name comes from the Sanskrit words simha (सिंह), meaning "lion", and āsana (आसन), meaning "posture" or "seat". The pose has also been named Narasimhasana, as in the 19th century Joga Pradipika, from Sanskrit नरसिंह Narasimha, a lion-man avatar of the god Vishnu. The posture is described in the tenth century Vimānārcanākalpa.

== Description ==
The practitioner kneels with the buttocks on the inner arches of the feet, stretches the arms forwards with the hands outspread just off the ground, and makes a facial expression with the mouth open wide and the tongue out to resemble a lion. The yoga guru B. K. S. Iyengar notes in his 1966 Light on Yoga that this is the traditional pose; he calls it Simhasana I.

== Variations ==
Iyengar's Simhasana II begins from lotus position (Padmasana). The practitioner then stands on the knees and moves the body forwards until the front of the body faces the floor and the shoulders are directly above the hands, the arms straight. The facial expression is the same as before.

Yoga Journal has described a variant "Lion Pose" with the legs as in Muktasana with the facial and hand positions as in Simhasana, suggesting it as a suitable seat for pranayama.

== See also ==
- List of asanas
- Virasana, another ancient kneeling pose, without the facial gesture
