= Pātañjalayogaśāstravivaraṇa =

The 8th century Pātañjalayogaśāstravivaraṇa (Sub-commentary on Patanjali's Yoga Commentary), also called the Yogasūtrabhāṣyavivaraṇa (Sub-commentary on the Commentary on the Yoga Sutras) is Ādi Śaṅkara's commentary on Patanjali's own commentary, the bhāṣya, on his Yoga Sutras.

As well as remarking briefly on each sutra, it gives descriptions of the 12 seated asanas named in the bhāṣya, including Dandasana, Svastikasana, and Virasana.

The text was rediscovered in the 20th century, published in Madras in 1952, and partly translated into English by Trevor Leggett (Book 1 in 1961, Book 2 in 1983), completed in 1990. The full translation of all four books by T. S. Rukmani was published in 2001. The ascription of authorship to Śaṅkara has been debated.

== Sources ==
- Bryant, Edwin F. (2009). The Yoga Sūtras of Patañjali: A New Edition, Translation and Commentary. New York: North Point Press. ISBN 978-0865477360.
- Leggett, Trevor Pryce (2016) [1990 (Kegan Paul)]. The Complete Commentary by Sankara on the Yoga-Sutras: The Vivarana sub-commentary to Vyasa-bhasya on the Yoga-sutras of Patanjali | A Full Translation of the Newly-Discovered Text (PDF). Trevor Leggett Adhyatma Yoga Trust. ISBN 978-1-911467-04-5.
- Mallinson, James; Singleton, Mark (2017). Roots of Yoga. Penguin Books. ISBN 978-0-241-25304-5. OCLC 928480104.
- Rukmani, T. S. (2001). Yogasūtrabhāṣyavivaraṇa of Śaṅkara: Vivaraṇa text with English translation, and critical notes along with text and English translation of Patañjali's Yogasūtras and Vyāsabhāṣya. New Delhi: Munshiram Manoharlal. ISBN 978-81-215-0908-4. OCLC 46352942
