= Haṭha Ratnāvalī =

17th century text

The Haṭha Ratnāvalī is a Haṭha yoga text written in the 17th century by Srinivasa. It is one of the first texts to name 84 asanas, earlier texts having claimed as many without naming them. It describes 36 asanas.

== Text ==
It states (1.17-18) that asanas, breath retentions, and seals assist in Haṭha yoga. It mentions 8 purifications (shatkarmas), criticising the Hatha Yoga Pradipika for only describing 6 of these.

It is one of the earliest texts (the other being the unpublished Yogacintāmaṇi) actually to name 84 asanas, earlier manuscripts having simply claimed that 84 (Note: The number 84 is symbolic not literal: it is the product of 7, the number of planets in astrology, and 12, the number of signs of the zodiac, while in numerology, 84=(3+4)×(3×4).) or 8,400,000 asanas existed. The 84 asanas listed (HR 3.7-20) include several variations of Padmasana and Mayurasana, Gomukhasana, Bhairavasana, Matsyendrasana, Kurmasana, Kraunchasana, Mandukasana, Yoganidrasana, and many names now not in wide usage; it provides descriptions of 36 of these asanas.

== Sources ==
- Mallinson, James; Singleton, Mark (2017). Roots of Yoga. Penguin Classics. London: Penguin Books. ISBN 978-0-241-25304-5. OCLC 928480104.
- Srinivasa (2003). Gharote, M. L.; Devnath, Parimal (eds.). Haṭharatnāvalī (a treatise on Haṭhayoga) of Śrīnivāsayogi. Lonavala Yoga Institute (India). ISBN 978-81-901176-9-2. OCLC 52846127.
