= Pasasana =

Asana

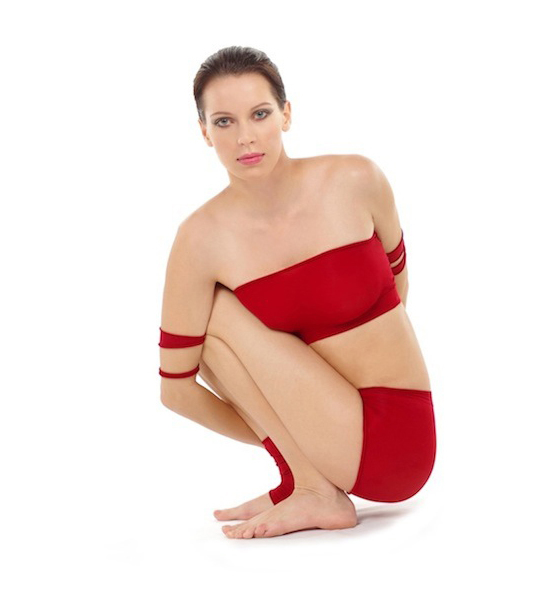
Pasasana

Pasasana (Sanskrit: पाशासन; IAST: pāśāsana) or Noose Pose is an asana, a sitting meditation pose.

== Etymology and origins ==
The name comes from the Sanskrit word पाश, pāśa meaning "noose" or "snare", and आसन, asana meaning "posture" or "seat".

The pose is described and illustrated in the 19th century Sritattvanidhi; a slightly different pose is described in the 1966 Light on Yoga.

== Description ==
In this yoga asana, the human body creates a 'noose' when the practitioner wraps their arms around their squatting legs (from Upaveshasana) with their hands clasped behind their back, while twisting to one side.

== See also ==
- List of asanas
- Pasini Mudra, the noose seal
