= Durvasasana =

Difficult standing posture in hatha yoga

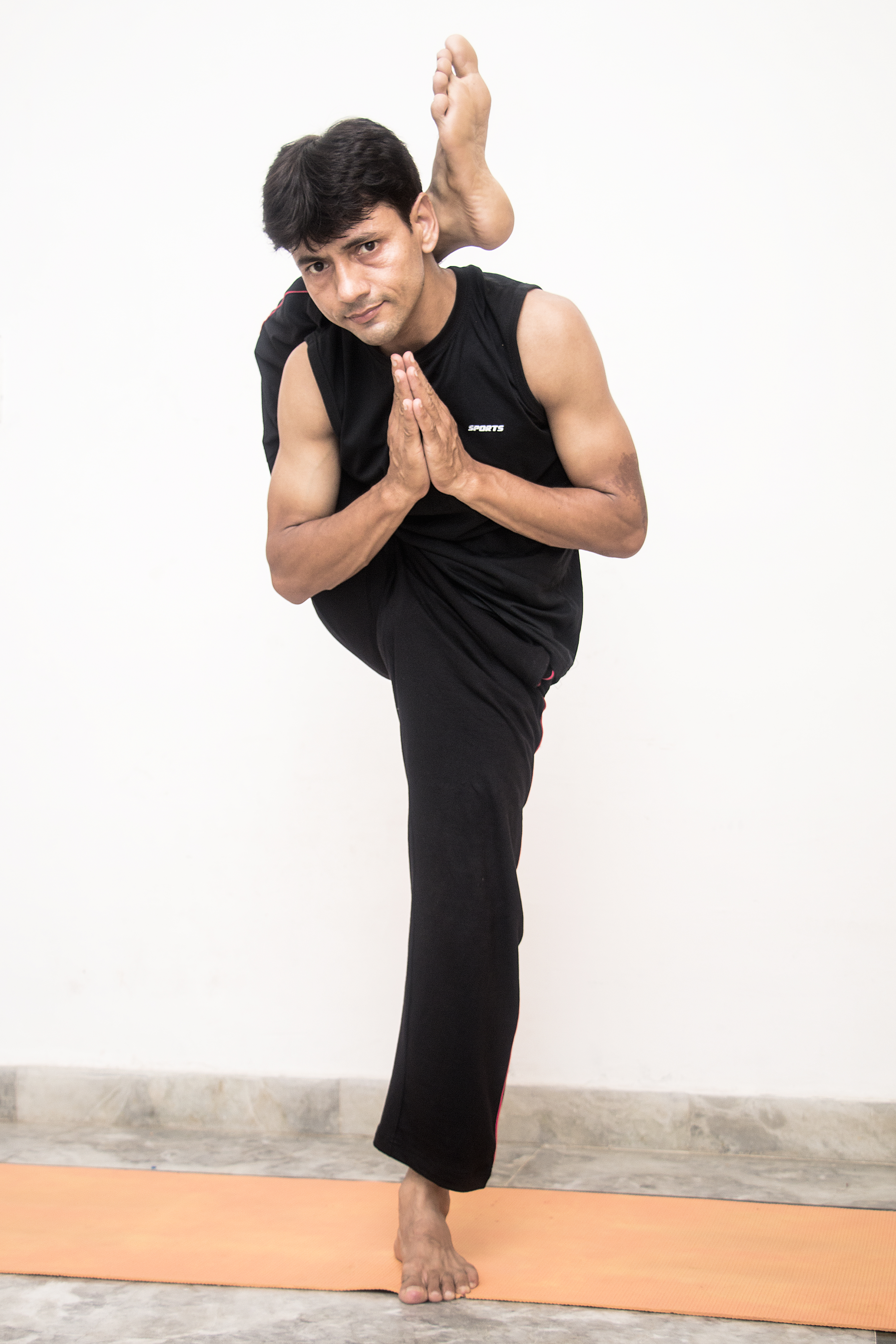
Durvasasana

Durvasasana (Sanskrit: दुर्वासासन) or Durvasana, is an advanced standing asana in hatha yoga, with one leg raised and the foot hooked behind the neck. The similar Trivikramasana (Sanskrit: त्रिविक्रमासन) has the raised leg straight. There are seated and reclining variations including Bhairavasana. Versions of the pose are depicted in statues in Karnataka and Tamil Nadu from the 8th century onwards. Trivikramasana is described in the 18th century Haṭhābhyāsapaddhati; a pose close to Durvasasana is illustrated as "Trivikramasana" in the 19th century Sritattvanidhi.

== Etymology and origins ==
Durvasasana is named after Durvasa (दुर्वासा), a proverbially angry sage.

Trivikramasana is named after Trivikrama, a figure in Hindu mythology whose name means "three strides". The pose is depicted in the 13th – 18th century statues of Bharatnatyam dance that decorate the Eastern Gopuram of the Nataraja Temple, Chidambaram in Tamil Nadu.

The 18th century Haṭhābhyāsapaddhati verse 81 describes a pose that it names Trivikramasana with the words "Place a foot on the neck and stand up".

The 19th century Sritattvanidhi describes and illustrates a pose that it names Trivikramasana, but which the yoga scholar Norman Sjoman states is Durvasasana.

The name Bhairavasana comes from the Sanskrit Bhairava (भैरव) meaning "terrible, formidable". Kāla (काल) Bhairava is the Hindu god Shiva in his aspect as the universe's destroyer. The pose is illustrated in the Sritattvanidhi under the name Aṇkuśāsana (अण्कुशआसन), from Sanskrit अण्कुश aṇkuś, an elephant goad.

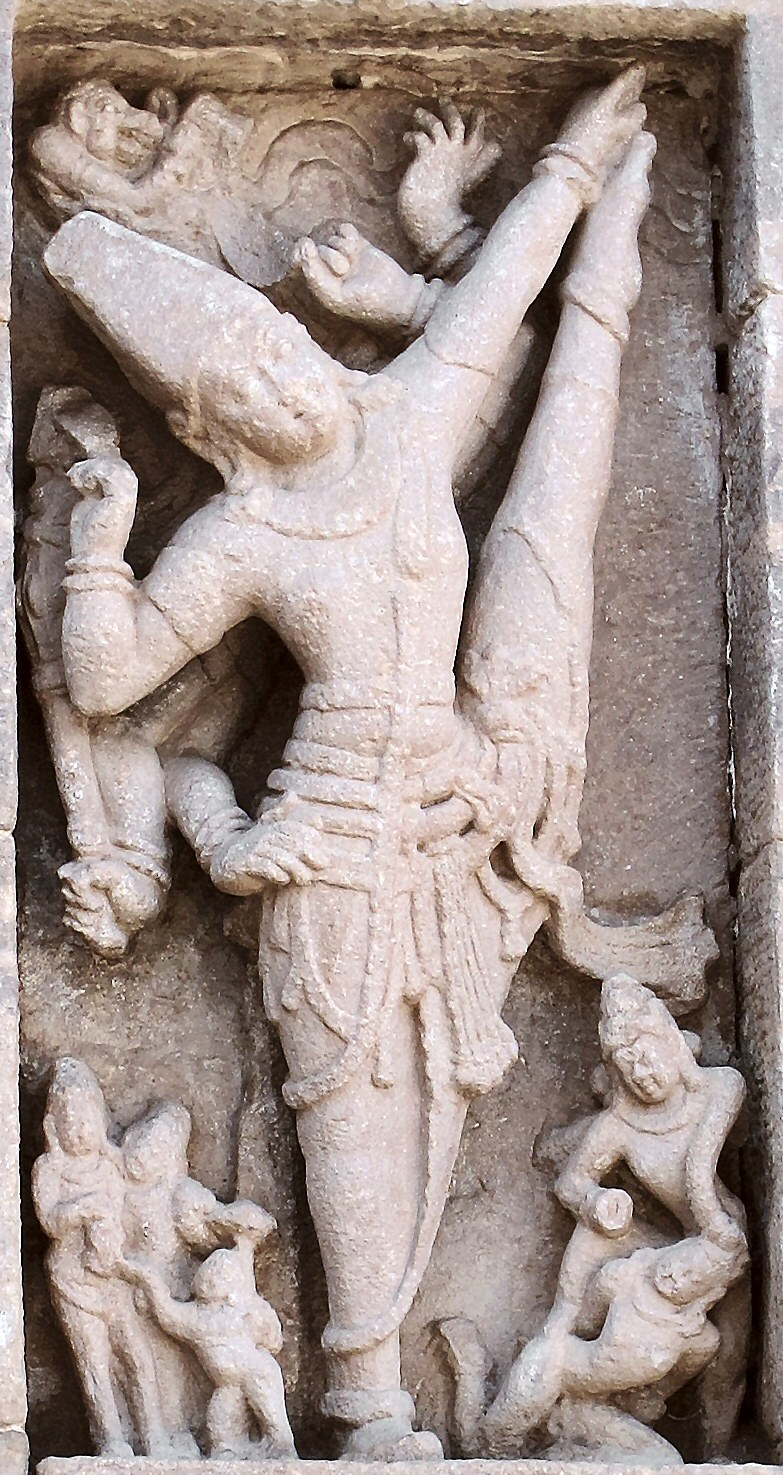
Vamana striding the heavens as Trivikrama. Pattadakal Virupaksa Temple, Karnataka, 8th century

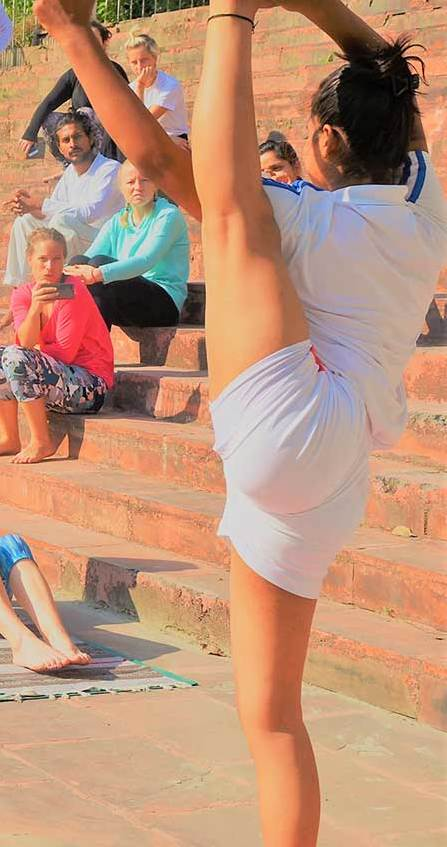
Trivikramasana

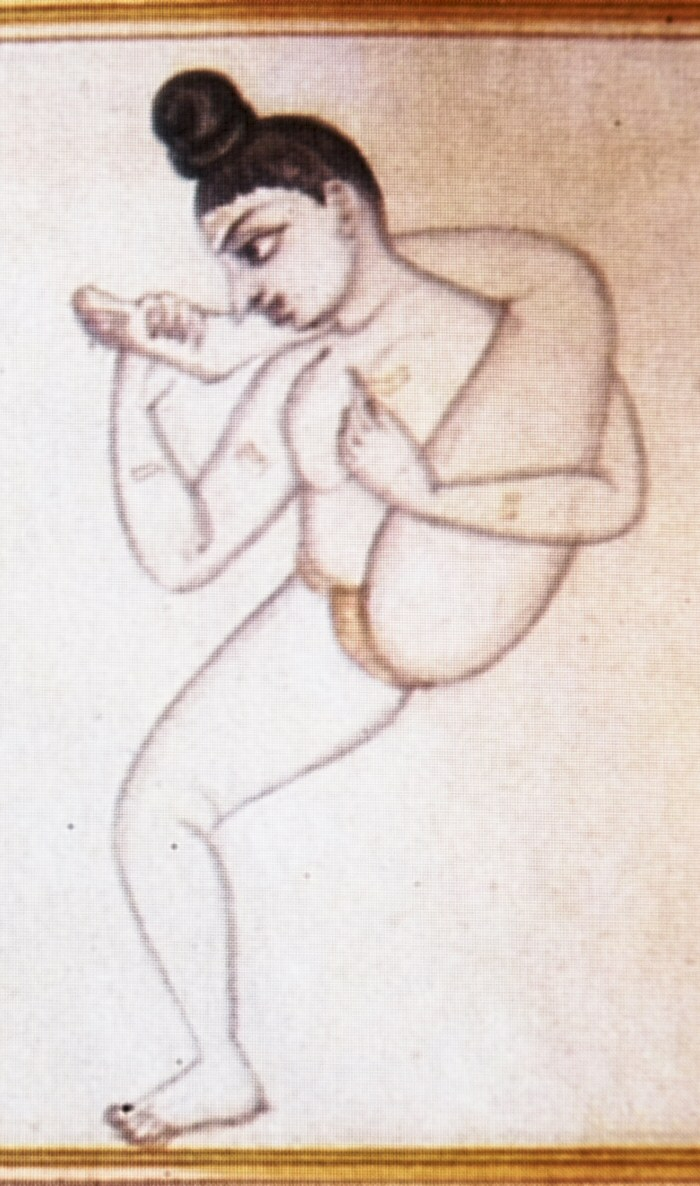
Pose labelled Trivikramasana in the 19th century Sritattvanidhi

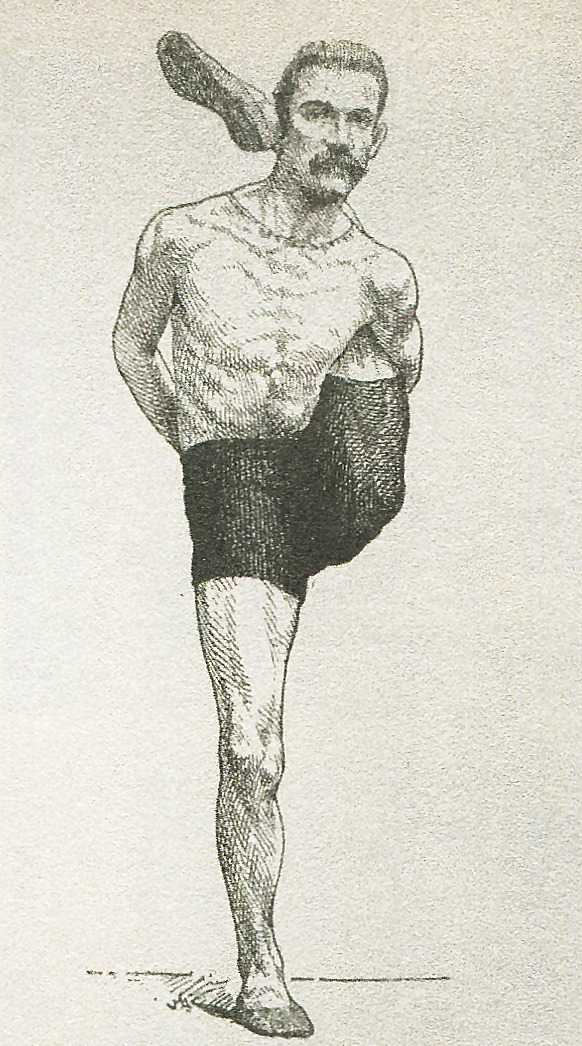
A pose close to Durvasasana in Thomas Dwight's 1889 The Anatomy of a Contortionist

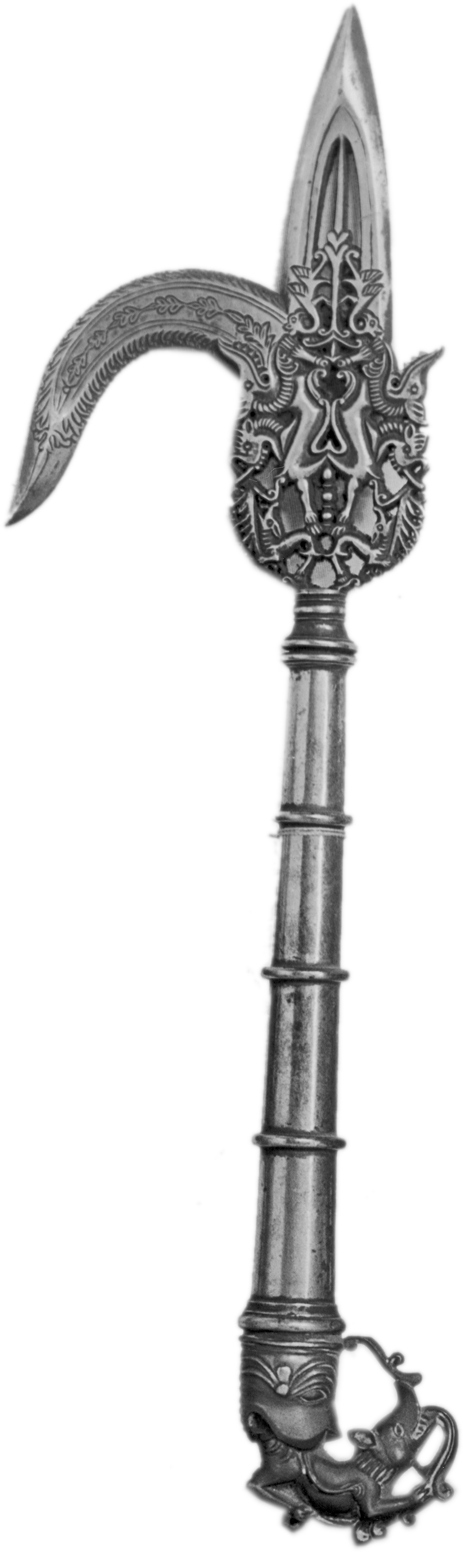
Indian elephant goad or Aṇkuś, (17th century example shown), giving the name Aṇkuśāsana
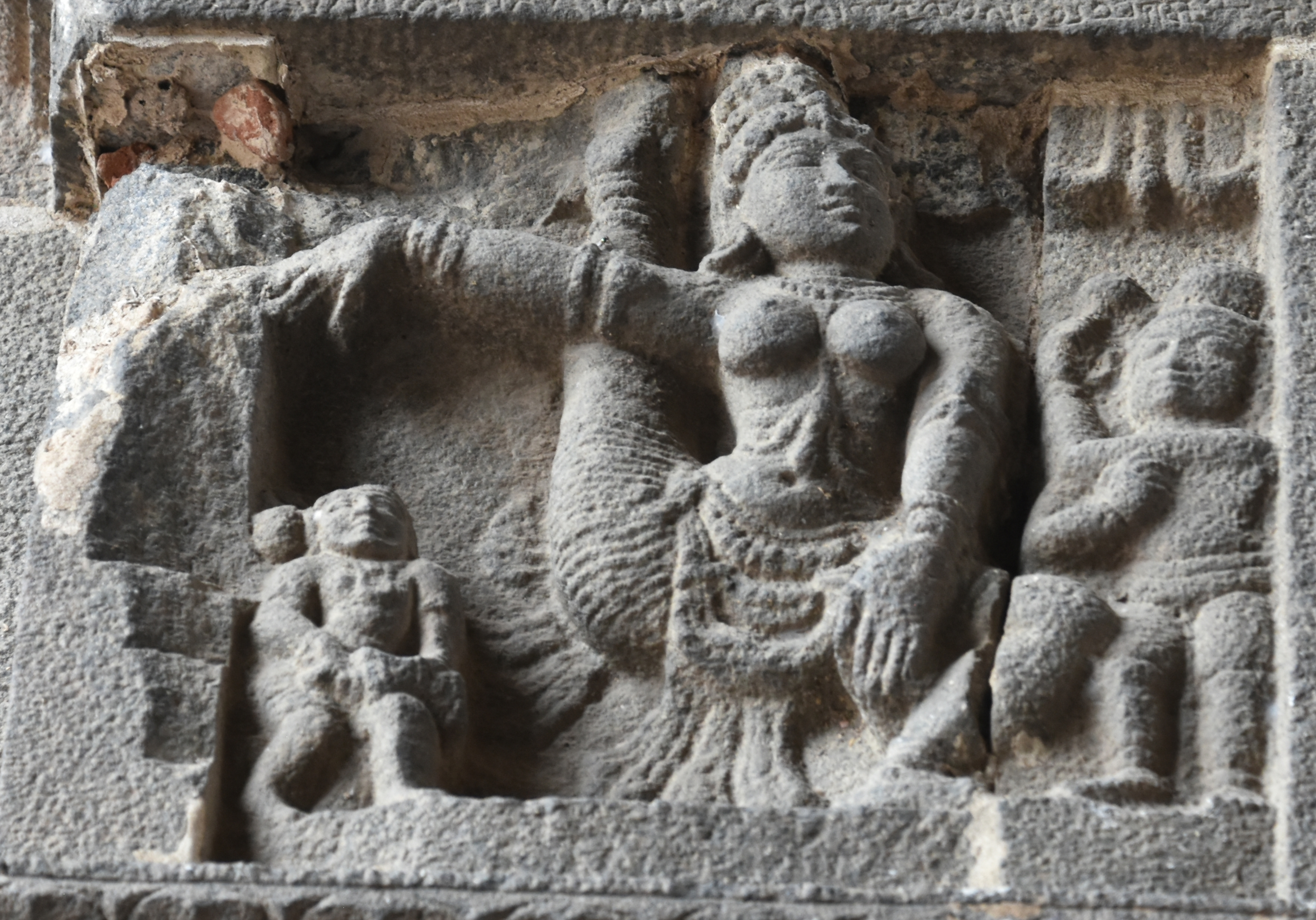
One of 108 dance mudra poses at Nataraja Temple, Chidambaram, Tamil Nadu. 13th–18th century

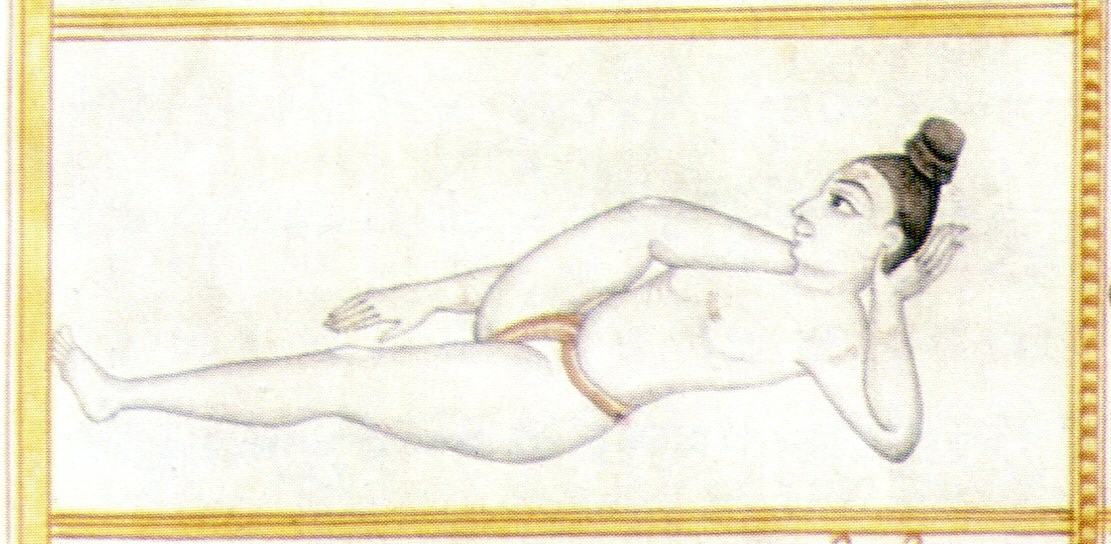
Aṇkuśāsana in the Sritattvanidhi.
The pose is now usually called (Supta) Bhairavasana.

== Description ==
Durvasasana is an advanced standing balancing pose with one leg behind the neck; the hands are held together over the chest in prayer position. As well as rating the pose of difficulty level 21 (out of 60), B. K. S. Iyengar states that it is difficult to balance in the pose, and recommends using a support to begin with. In Ashtanga (vinyasa) yoga, the breathing in the pose is stated to be either natural or ujjayi.

== Variations ==
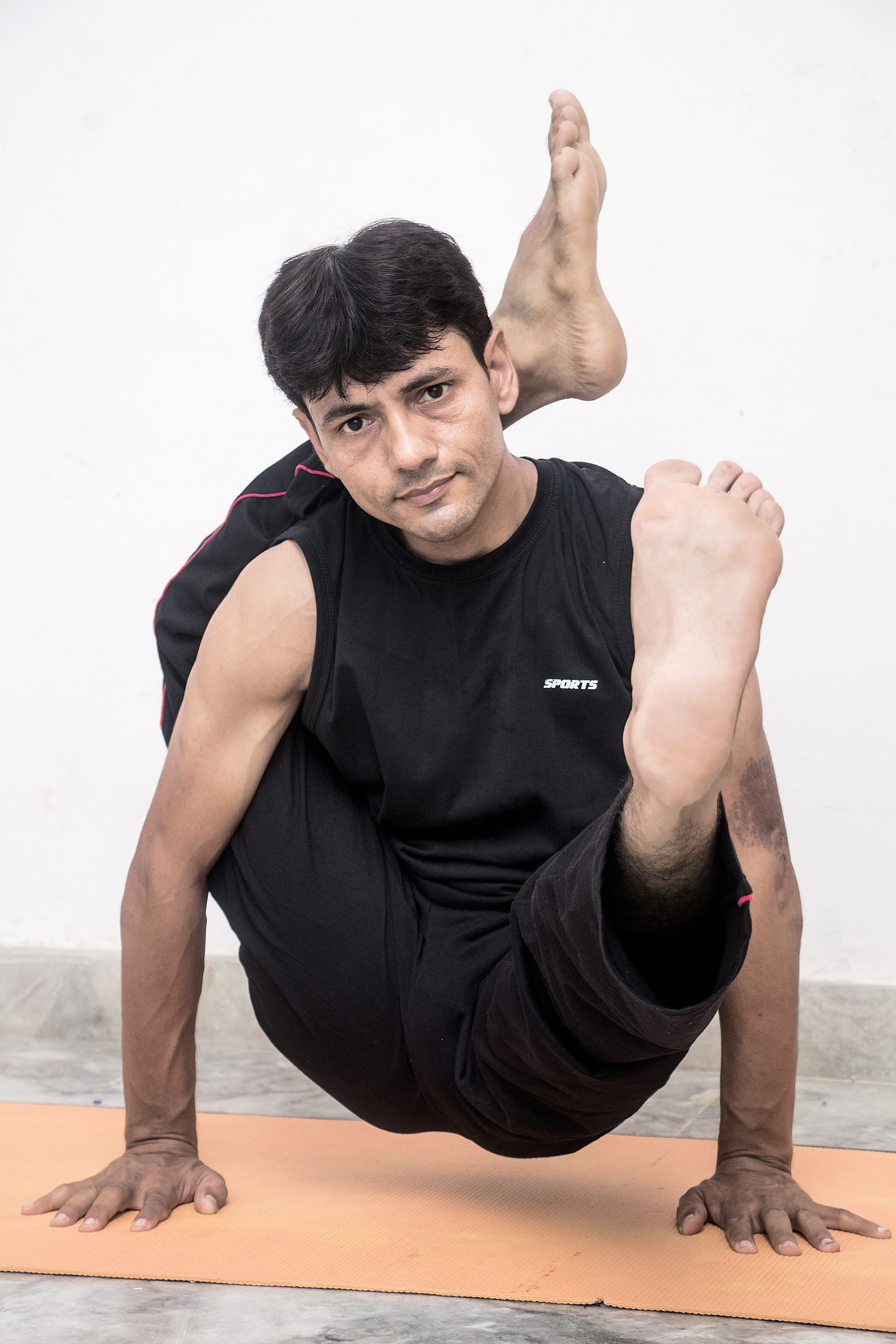
Chakorasana, a variant of Eka Pada Sirsasana with full arm balance

Seated

Eka Pada Sirsasana (literally "One Foot Head Pose", also called Foot behind the Head Pose) is the seated variant of Durvasasana. One leg is stretched straight forwards along the ground; the other is hooked behind the neck. The hands may be placed in prayer position. It should not be confused with Eka Pada Sirsasana, a variant of Sirsasana (headstand).

Standing

Trivikramasana has one leg stretched straight up beside the body; the ankle is grasped with one hand. The other arm is stretched straight out sideways.

Reclining

Supta Trivikramasana or "Supine Splits" is the reclining form of Trivikramasana. In Light on Yoga, Iyengar marks it as a difficult pose at level 39.

(Supta) Bhairavasana, also called Aṇkuśāsana or Elephant Goad Pose, is the reclining form of Durvasasana. The hands are held in prayer position in front of the chest.

Balancing

Kala Bhairavasana (काला भैरवासन) has the body balanced one side up, on the straight leg and the arm on that side, somewhat as in Utthita Vasisthasana, but with the other leg behind the neck.

Chakorasana, from Sanskrit चकोर Chakora, a partridge, is an arm-balancing variant. Both hands are on the ground, the arms straight; one leg is hooked behind the neck; the other leg is stretched up; the body is suspended from the shoulders.

== Sources ==
- Iyengar, B. K. S. (1979) [1966]. Light on Yoga: Yoga Dipika. Thorsons. ISBN 978-1855381667.
- Sjoman, Norman E. (1999) [1996]. The Yoga Tradition of the Mysore Palace. Abhinav Publications. ISBN 81-7017-389-2.
