= Mayurasana =

Hand-balancing posture in hatha yoga

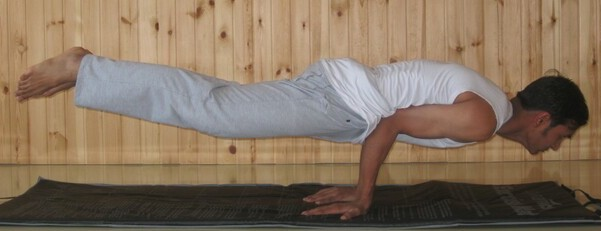
Mayurasana

Mayūrāsana (Sanskrit: मयूरासन) or Peacock pose is a hand-balancing asana in hatha yoga and modern yoga as exercise with the body held horizontal over the hands. It is one of the oldest non-seated asanas, described in the 10th century.

== Etymology and origins ==
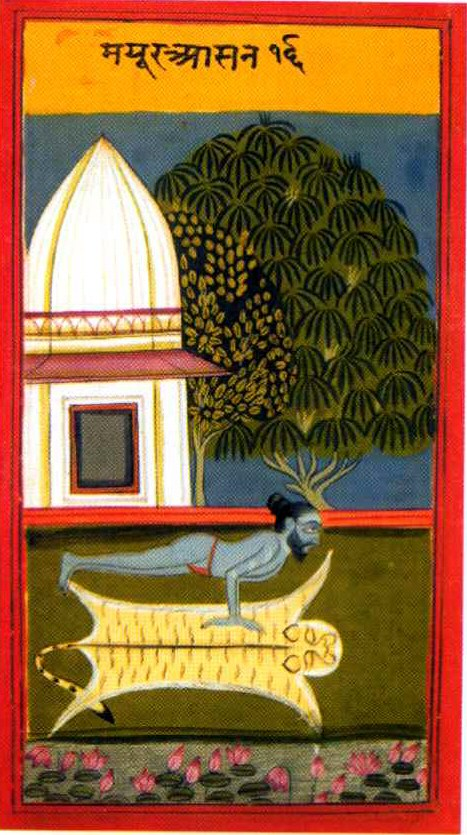
Mayurasana in an illustrated manuscript of the Jogapradipika, 1830

The name comes from the Sanskrit words mayūra (मयूर) meaning "peacock" and āsana (आसन) meaning "posture".

Mayurasana is one of the oldest non-seated asanas used in hatha yoga; it is first described in the 10th century Vimānārcanākalpa. The Vāsiṣṭha Saṁhitā 1.76-7 states that it destroys all sins.

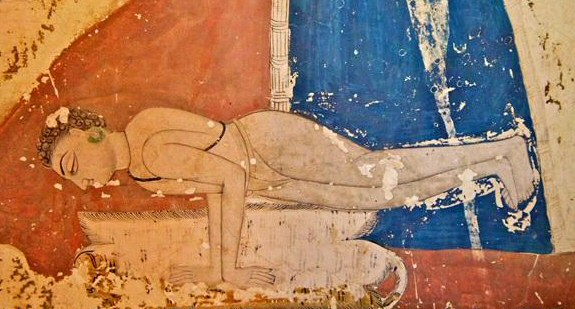
Mural depicting a Nath yogi in Mayurasana at the Mahamandir temple, Jodhpur, India, c. 1810

== Description ==
In this asana the body is raised like a horizontal stick holding the floor with both palms while the body is supported by the elbows.

== Variations ==
Hamsasana (Swan Pose) is identical to Mayurasana except that the hands are placed with the fingers pointing forwards.

Padma Mayurasana (Lotus in Peacock Pose) has the legs crossed as in Lotus Position.

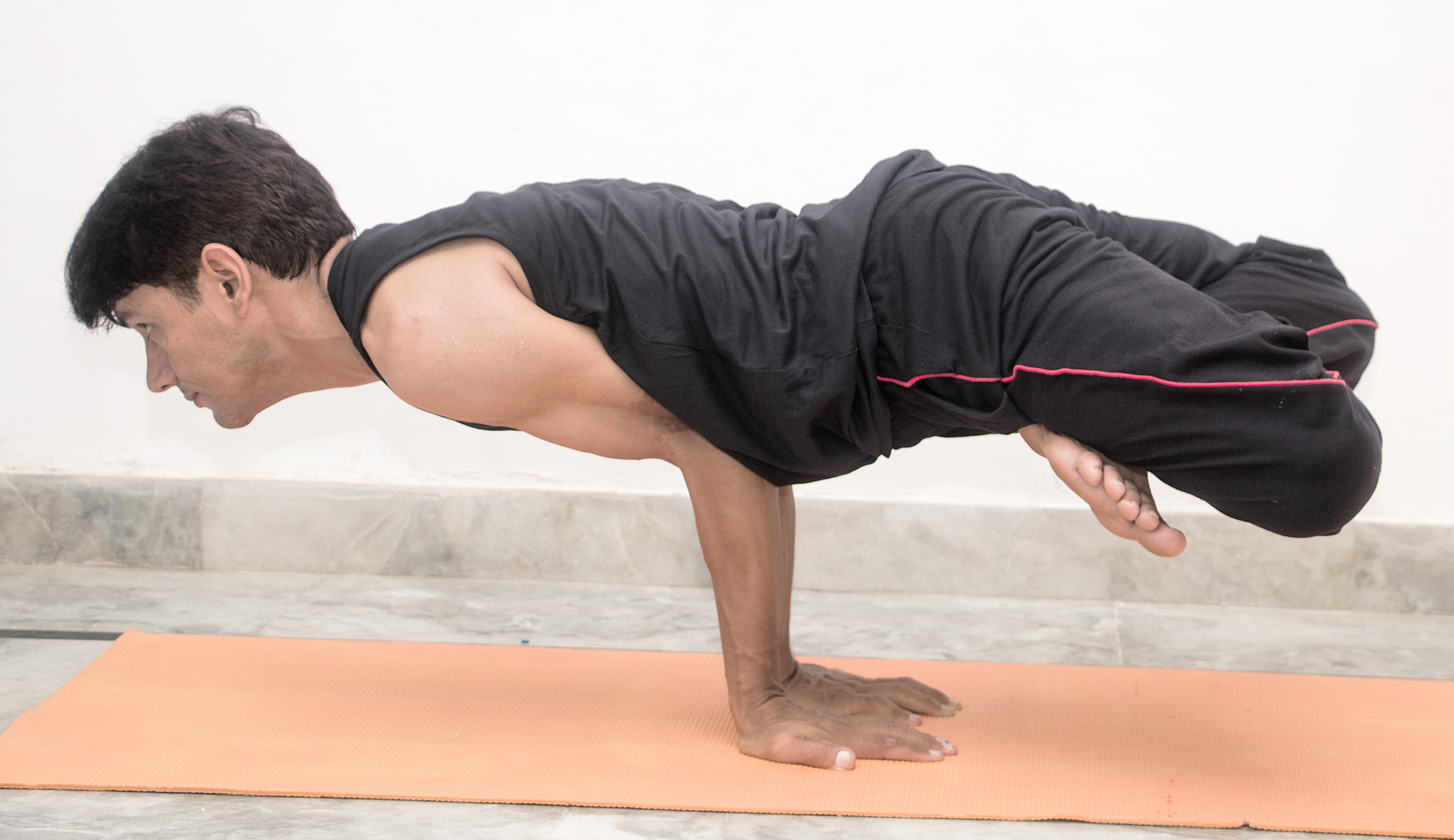
Padma Mayurasana

== See also ==
- List of asanas
- Planche (exercise)
- Vrischikasana, scorpion pose, with variations including Pincha Mayurasana

== Sources ==
- Iyengar, B. K. S. (1979) [1966]. Light on Yoga: Yoga Dipika. Unwin Paperbacks. ISBN 978-1855381667.
