= Baddha Konasana =

Seated posture in hatha yoga

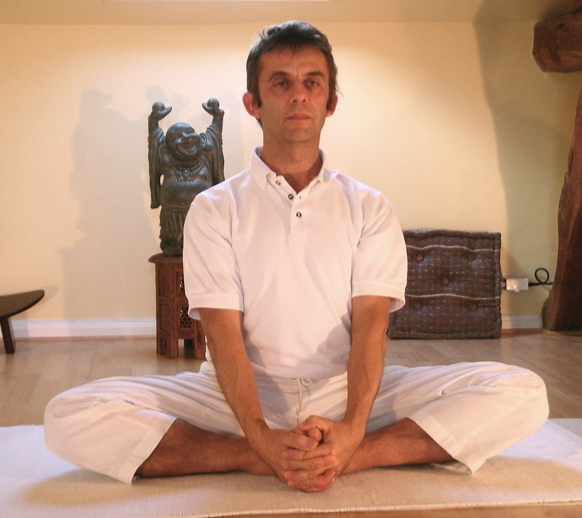
Baddha Konasana

Baddha Konasana (Sanskrit: बद्धकोणासन; IAST: IAST: baddhakoṇāsana), Bound Angle Pose, Butterfly Pose, or Cobbler's Pose (after the typical sitting position of Indian cobblers when they work), was historically known as Bhadrasana, or Throne Pose. It is a seated asana in hatha yoga and modern yoga as exercise. The pose is also suitable as a meditation seat when the knees rest on the floor.

== Etymology and origins ==
The name Baddha Konasana comes from the Sanskrit words बद्ध, Baddha meaning "bound", कोण, Koṇa meaning "angle", and आसन, Āsana meaning "posture" or "seat".

The name Baddha Konasana is relatively recent, but the pose is medieval, as the meditation seat Bhadrasana (from भद्रा Bhadra, "throne") is described in verses 1.53-54 of the 15th century Haṭha Yoga Pradīpikā.

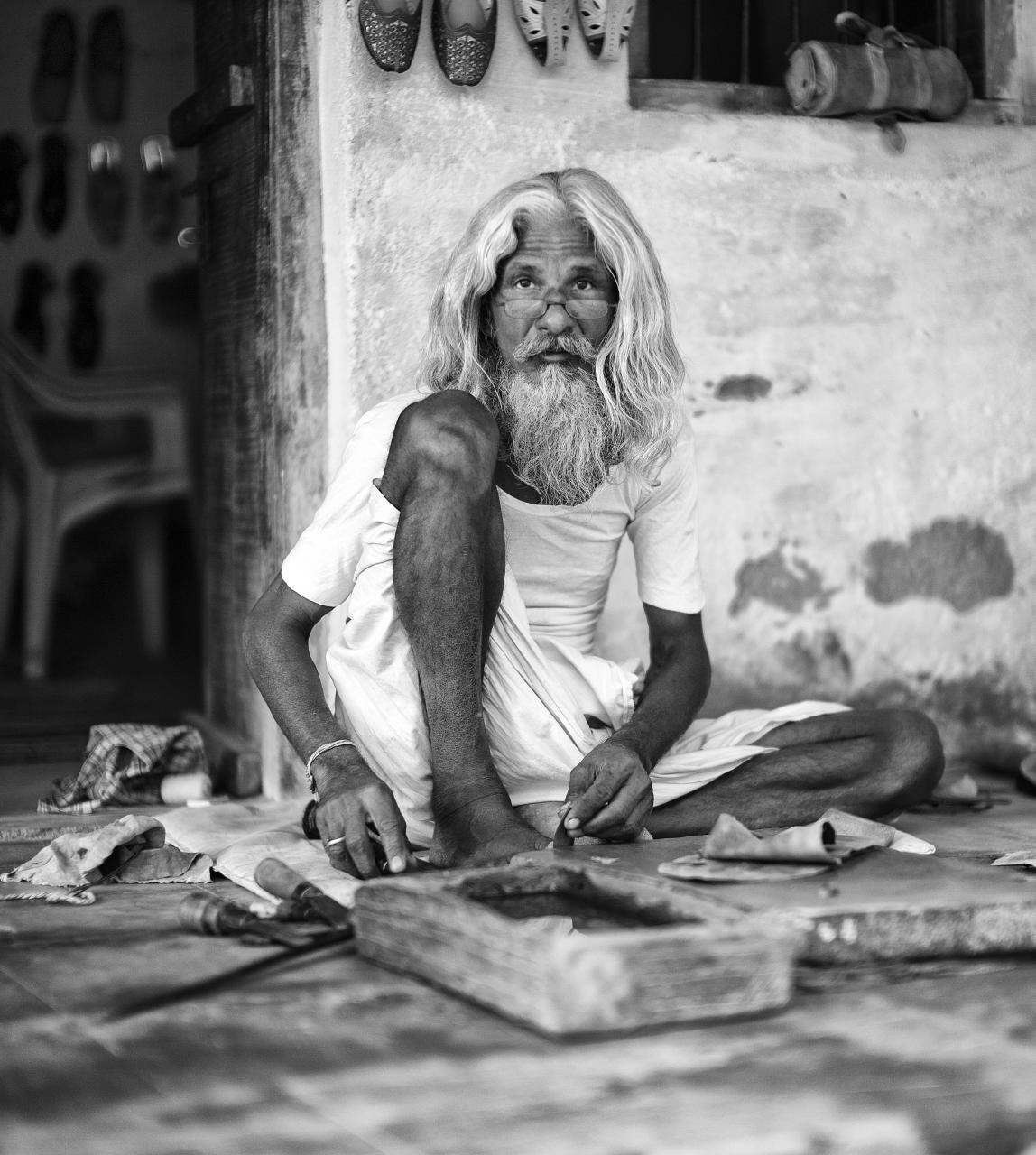
A cobbler in Rajasthan, working in Ardha Baddha Konasana

== Description ==
From sitting position with both the legs outstretched forward, hands by the sides, palms resting on the ground, fingers together pointing forward, the legs are folded at the knees so the soles of the feet meet. The legs are grasped at the ankles and folded more until the heels reach the perineum. The knees move down to the ground, and with practice reach there; the body is erect and the gaze in front. The asana is held before coming back to the starting position. The thighs are stretched with care. When used for meditation, the hands are placed in Anjali mudra (prayer position) in front of the chest.

The pose strongly opens hip and groin, and is one of the few yoga asanas that can be practiced comfortably soon after eating, except for the forward-bending variation with the head on the floor. In Light on Yoga, B. K. S. Iyengar cites Grantly Dick-Read's Childbirth Without Fear noting that the pose is beneficial to pregnant women, as regular practice reduces pain during delivery. It states that if there is a groin or knee injury, the knees must be supported on folded blankets.

== Variations ==
A common variant is Supta Baddha Konasana, or Reclining Cobbler's Pose, from सुप्त, supta, meaning "supine" or "reclining".

In pregnancy, the pose can be practised reclining as "Wall Butterfly", with the buttocks and feet against a wall, feet together, the knees falling to the sides. The hands can be used to press the knees.

In Tarasana, or Star Pose, the body bends forwards over the clasped feet.

With the thighs supported on folded blankets, 10-pound sandbags may be placed on the inner thigh (near the groin) to assist the stretch.

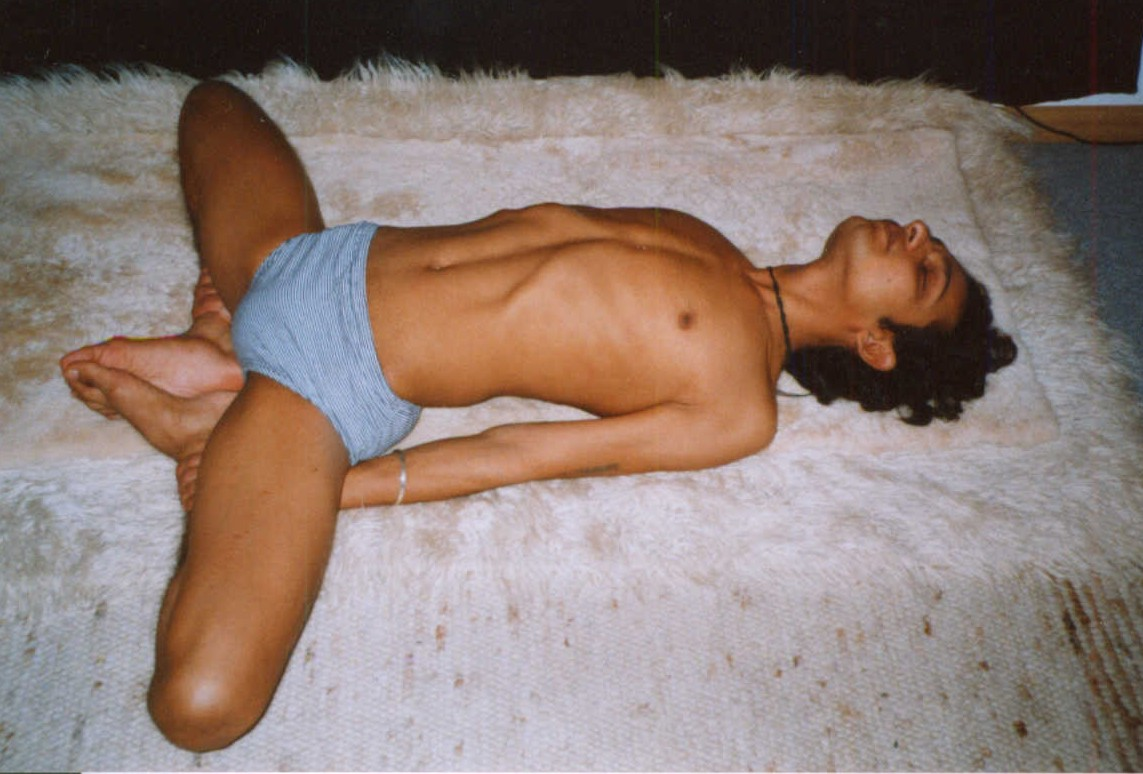
Supta Baddha Konasana, Reclining Cobbler's Pose

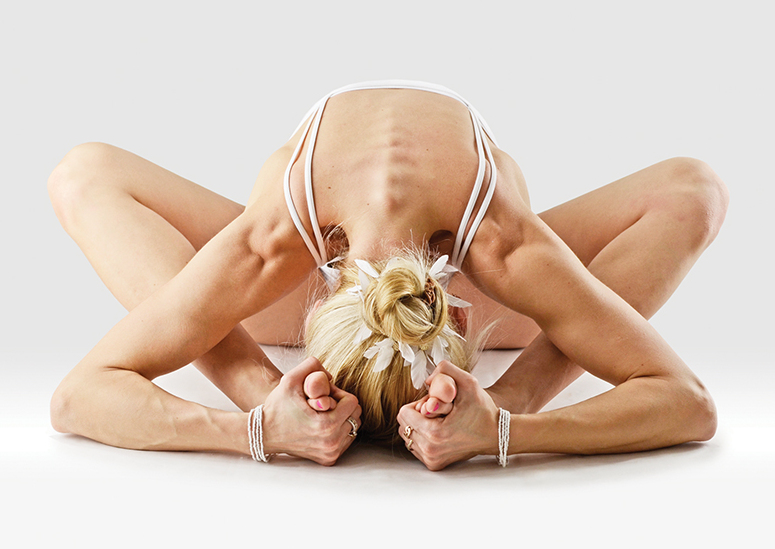
Tarasana, Star Pose

Baddha Konasana with forward bend

== See also ==
- List of asanas

== Sources ==
- Iyengar, B. K. S. (1991) [1966]. Light on Yoga. London: Thorsons. ISBN 978-0-00-714516-4. OCLC 51315708.
- Mehta, Silva; Mehta, Mira; Mehta, Shyam (1990). Yoga: The Iyengar Way. Dorling Kindersley. ISBN 978-0-86318-420-8.
