= Seetharaman Sundaram =

Indian lawyer, yogi

- In Halasana, Plough Pose, 1928
- Born: 25 February 1901
- Died: 26 December 1994 (aged 93)
- Occupations: Lawyer, Yogacharya
- Known for: Yogic Physical Culture

Seetharaman Sundaram (25 February 1901 – 26 December 1994) was a lawyer and pioneer of yoga as exercise, often known as Yogacharya Sundaram, and the first person to publish a handbook of yoga asanas in English, his 1928 Yogic Physical Culture. This was also the first yoga book to be illustrated with photographs. He travelled India with the bodybuilder K. V. Iyer, helping to popularise the new blend of hatha yoga and physical culture.

== Life ==
Seetharaman Sundaram was born in Mathurai, Tamil Nadu in a Brahmin family. He trained as a lawyer and worked in law throughout his career. He ran the Yogic School of Physical Culture (also called the Sri Sundara Yoga Shala) in Bangalore in the 1930s, and travelled around India with the bodybuilder K. V. Iyer doing lecture/demonstrations, Iyer on muscles, Sundaram on yoga. His legal colleagues did not know that he was revered as a yoga guru; in 1949, a retired high court judge was astonished to see Sundaram being seen off at Madras's Central Railway Station by a crowd of wealthy and powerful people, prostrating before the garlanded figure of the man he knew as a lawyer.

== Yogic Physical Culture ==
In 1928 he published Yogic Physical Culture, describing a modernised hatha yoga reworked as a combination of gymnastics, bodybuilding, and hygiene, illustrated with photographs. It explicitly references contemporary Western physical culture as well as traditional Indian philosophy; and it goes along with Indian nationalism by stating that the "sons of India" will need to combine yoga asanas with bodybuilding to "obtain super-strength to make their Mother [India] an equal sister among Nations!" The language of the book, with phrases like "Physical Culture Religion", also echoes the bodybuilder Eugen Sandow's idea of making the body holy through physical fitness. In Sundaram's view, argues the yoga scholar Mark Singleton, the "tinge of religion" (Sundaram's phrase) makes yoga different from and superior to the purely material Western forms of exercise.

The book describes just 13 asanas: the eleven (Note: Kuvalayananda described Sirsasana, Sarvangasana, Matsyasana, Halasana, Bhujangasana, Salabhasana, Dhanurasana, Ardha Matsyendrasana, Paschimottanasana, Mayurasana, and Savasana.) covered by Kuvalayananda in his 1926 book, plus Trikonasana and Padahastasana. Sundaram stated that these provided a complete workout for "an average man of health". Kuvalayananda also included in his selection from hatha yoga's techniques one bandha, one mudra, one kriya, and two pranayama exercises. The format, essentially a field guide with the name of each item, a description in text, and a photograph, was adopted by all later yoga manuals including Light on Yoga. It introduces a procedural innovation, too, creating stages in the adoption of each asana, something entirely missing from medieval texts like the Hatha Yoga Pradipika. The photographs are all of Sundaram himself, presented not as a new system like that of Sandow and the other bodybuilders like Bernarr Macfadden (whom Sundaram references), but as of Sundaram's way of practising an age-old system. The effect was to demystify the asanas: they turned from difficult, strange, even repulsive spiritual practices into mere exercises.

In Elliott Goldberg's view, Sundaram's detailed instructions moved the practice of asanas from what had "in all likelihood" been perfunctory and haphazard towards the precision of modern yoga, in which close attention is paid to the tensions in individual muscles. This approach, Goldberg argues, led to executing the asanas slowly and under control, observing one's body and making necessary adjustments accordingly to achieve correct alignment. All of this facilitated total absorption in the task of performing each asana properly, which in turn allowed the practitioner to go beyond pain or pleasure to the absolute.

== Legacy ==
Dr. Asana Andiappan, founder of the Sundara Yoga and Natural Living Trust and the monthly Asana International Yoga Journal, studied yoga under Sundaram as a child.

== Works ==
- 1928 Yogic Physical Culture or the Secret of Happiness. Bangalore: Brahmacharya Publishing.

== See also ==
- Yogasopana, an earlier yoga manual, written in Marathi and illustrated with halftone plates

== Sources ==
- Goldberg, Elliott (2016). The Path of Modern Yoga : the history of an embodied spiritual practice. Rochester, Vermont: Inner Traditions. ISBN 978-1-62055-567-5. OCLC 926062252.
- Singleton, Mark (2010). Yoga body : the origins of modern posture practice. Oxford University Press. ISBN 978-0-19-539534-1. OCLC 318191988.
