= Eva Ruchpaul =

French Yoga teacher

Éva Ruchpaul
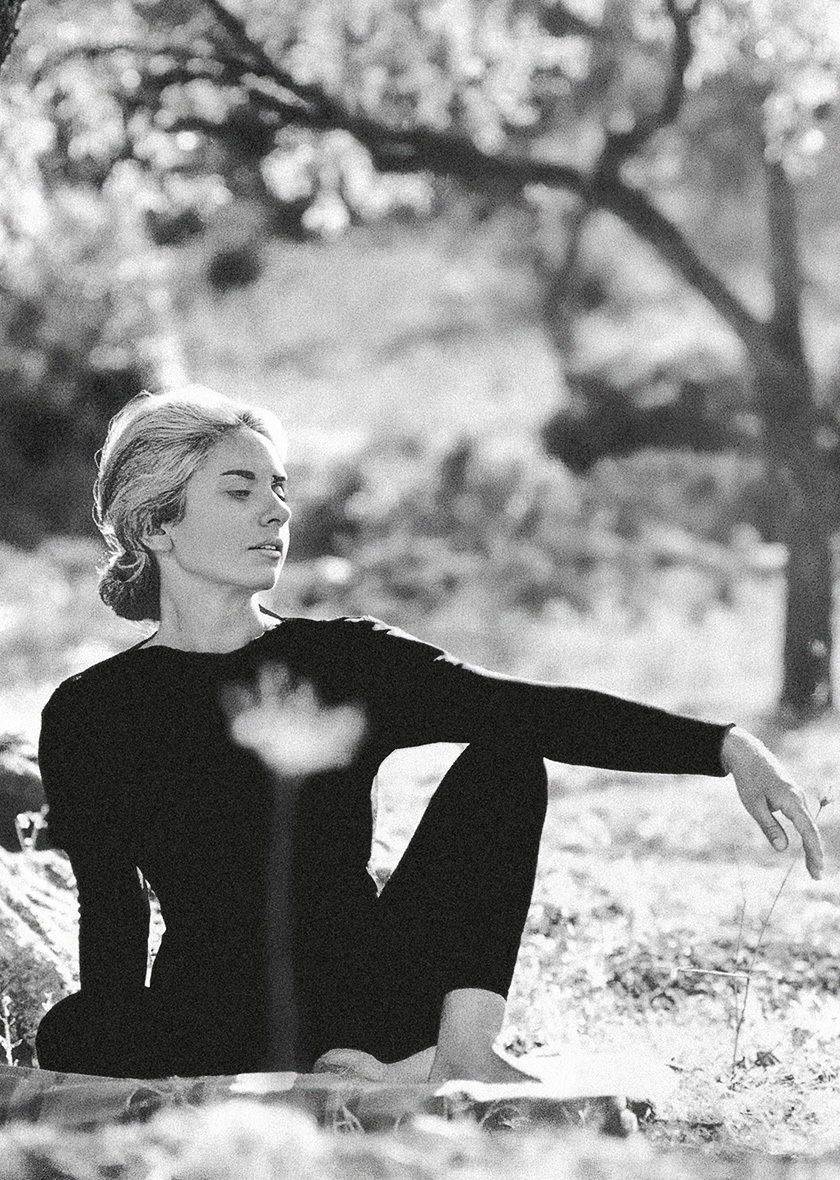
- Born: Felix; 13 March 1928 (age 98); Béziers
- Occupation: Yoga teacher training
- Years active: 1958–2023
- Known for: Yoga in France
- Notable work: Hatha yoga bien tempéré — P.U.F. 1978
- Website: https://yoga-eva-ruchpaul.com

Éva Ruchpaul (French pronunciation: [eva ʁyʃpol], born Felix on March 13, 1928, in Béziers) is one of the first yoga teachers in Europe, a French yoga teacher trainer, and author of books on hatha yoga. She developed a style of hatha yoga suited to Westerners.

== Biography ==
=== Childhood ===
Éva Ruchpaul was born in Béziers in the south of France in 1928. She contracted polio at the age of 18 months, which paralysed her left side and right arm. She spent her mornings at the clinic undergoing rehabilitation, and her afternoons at the beach. She then lived in Alexandria, where her father was a philosophy teacher at the French Lycée. She was unable to walk, but was a strong swimmer. From an early age, she explored the potential of her body and breath. She realised that the rehabilitation technique she was made to follow was not suitable for her. The progress she made through intensive practice was undone as soon as she fell ill. However, as her immune system was weak, she often fell ill. Rather than repeating the same movement endlessly, she tried doing it once, focusing all her attention on the movement and breathing. This method proved effective, enabling her to regain some mobility. It was only much later that she realised that what she had been doing was yoga. She did not go to school: "I taught myself to read by cutting letters out of cardboard."

=== Teenage years ===
In 1939, Éva and her family returned to France because her father wanted to defend his country in the event of war. In September 1939, France entered the Second World War. Éva underwent major surgery, enabling her to walk at the age of 12 after many long months of painful rehabilitation. The Nazis occupied northern France, while the rest of the country turned to collaboration (the Vichy regime, known as the Zone libre). The family lived in the Zone libre. For her, this period was a happy memory because she could go to school. She moved up from Year 7 to Year 10. Her family was involved in the Resistance. Her father worked for the intelligence services, while her brother joined the Maquis in the Vercors region. In 1942, the Nazis invaded the Zone libre. Éva and her parents moved in with an uncle near Nice, which was occupied by the Italians at the time. She passed her Baccalauréat in philosophy and mathematics at the age of 14, four years ahead of schedule. The Nazi occupation replaced the Italian fascist occupation in September 1943, and lasted until the Allied landings in Provence in August 1945. These last few months of the war were the hardest for Éva. Her family lives in near-clandestinity: "I was fleeing from place to place with my mum and my limp." (Note: Original version: "moi, je fuyais d'endroit en endroit avec ma maman et puis ma boiterie.") Over 17 months, they changed their identities and places of residence 11 times, using false documents and new names. Éva suffered from a lack of food, but above all from unsanitary conditions. At the end of the Second World War in 1945, she returned to Alexandria with her family. She suffered from depression, but continued in further education.

=== Youth in Paris ===
Ruchpaul moved to Paris to study graphic design and painting at the École Claude Bernard. She lived with the Casadesus family of musicians for two years while she was there. They introduced her to the vibrant intellectual and artistic scene of the post-war period. She was given a consultation with Haymant Ruchpaul, an Indian Brahmin, for her 20th birthday. He practised physiotherapy in the West, but was originally an Ayurvedic doctor. He had studied in France under Boris Dolto, a leading figure in orthopaedics. Haymant assured her that she could walk just like everyone else. Two years later, they married. Due to the after-effects of polio, her two pregnancies were difficult. During her second pregnancy, she had to stay in bed for seven months to avoid the risk of miscarriage. To keep her occupied, the Casadesus family sent her a suitcase full of books. These were the writings of doctors who had practised at the Russian court and travelled to India. These works introduced her to Eastern and Far Eastern thought. She gave birth to her children in 1956 and 1957.

=== Hatha yoga ===
It was around then (Note: There are conflicting accounts regarding the year in which she discovered Indian culture, and hatha yoga in particular.) that her husband introduced her to hatha yoga; but forbade her from studying with a teacher. She had to figure out the technical aspects of hatha yoga independently. She read extensively and was interested in the yoga taught by Sivananda in Rishikesh: "I «recognised», so to speak, the principles of the discipline of yoga as taught in Rishikesh by Shivananda. This technique seemed strangely familiar to me!" She drew on Louis Frédéric’s book "Yoga Asanas, méthode naturelle de culture physique et mentale et de rééducation respiratoire". The book consisted mainly of photographs of postures performed by Vishnudevananda, a hatha yoga teacher at Forest University in Rishikesh and a disciple of Sivananda. Inspired by the calmness that Vishnudevananda exuded in the photos in this book, Ruchpaul attempted the postures for the first time, using the book as a guide. As during her rehabilitation, one of the after-effects of polio serves as her guide. Her vision becomes blurred as soon as she overexerts herself. If the posture is not quite right, her vision deteriorates. For the same reason, she introduces a moment of recovery between each posture, as suggested by Swami Vishnudevananda. However, rather than simply relaxing, she expands upon this by structuring it into three breathing cycles.

== Career ==
Ruchpaul's husband recognised her aptitude for yoga and her natural teaching ability. As early as 1958, he introduced her to her first pupil. She dismissed it as a joke, doubting her own abilities. However, the pupil returned the following week, bringing new pupils with him. Ruchpaul developed her hatha yoga style through teaching. The success was as considerable as it was unexpected. Many famous people wanted to attend the classes. Among them were Françoise Hardy, Christian Dior, Alain Afflelou, Yves Montand, André Malraux André Essel, and Gérard Blitz. Between 1958 and 1968, Honoré Bonnet was the coach of the French ski team. He called on Ruchpaul to help prepare the athletes. The French team had never won so many medals before. Those trained during this period included Jean-Claude Killy, Marielle Goitschel, Christine Goitschel, Guy Perillat, François Bonlieu, Isabelle Mir and Annie Famose.

She published her first book in 1965 at the request of her students, "So That People Could Help Themselves", especially for those who could not come to see her every week. In 1978, Ruchpaul published Hatha Yoga Bien Tempéré, a book aimed at students undertaking teacher training. A veritable standard-bearer, it became known as the big black book or the bible among the hundreds of trainees who studied it to obtain their teaching diploma from the Institut Éva Ruchpaul.

== Institut Éva Ruchpaul ==
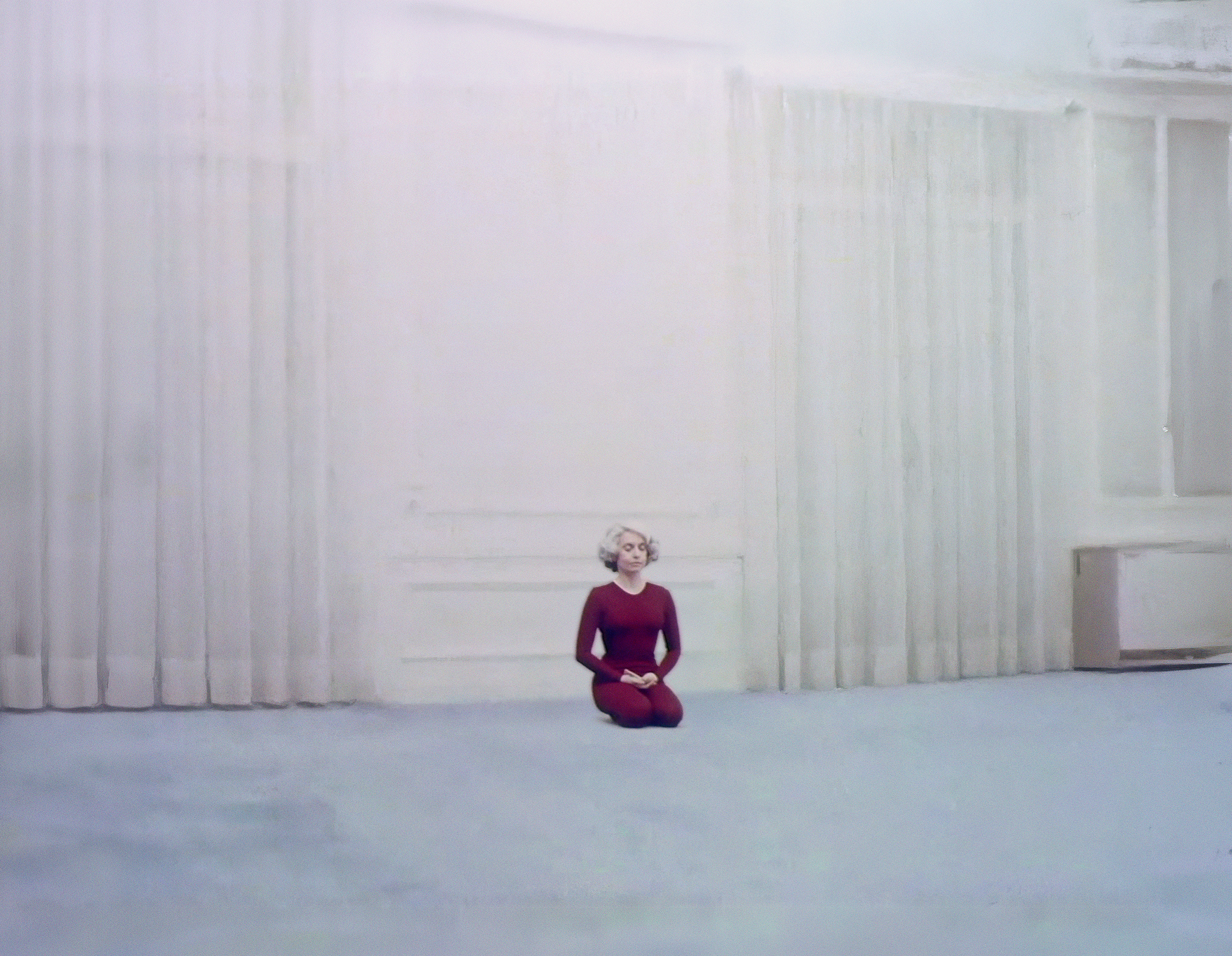
Éva Ruchpaul in the Diamond posture on the famous blue carpet at IER on Rue Troyon, 1978

In order to cope with the growing number of students in her classes, Ruchpaul started training teachers in her style of hatha yoga. She founded the Institut Éva Ruchpaul (IER) and its legendary blue carpet in 1971 for this purpose. The training program lasts three years. For each yoga posture, the training covers anatomy, psychophysiology, pedagogy and Indian philosophy. The IER offers yoga classes for all levels. It is accredited by the French Ministry of Higher Education. To explore topics in greater depth and stay up to date with the latest discoveries, the IER invites specialists to deliver teacher training and professional development; scientists include Valérie Daugé, Dr Trémolière, Hubert Reeves, Paul Masson-Oursel, Alfred Vidal-Madjar, Albert Jacquard, Joël de Rosnay, Karlfried Graf Durckheim and Michel Cazenave; Indologists include Philippe Lavastine, Pierre-Sylvain Filliozat and Colette Poggi. In 1997, the IER relocated from Rue Troyon, near the Champs-Élysées, to Rue de Rome. Éva Ruchpaul lived in an attic flat in the building that housed the IER, and was still teaching at the age of 95.

The Fédération Inter-enseignements de hatha yoga (Note: Translation: Inter-Teaching Federation of Hatha Yoga) (FIDHY) was founded by former students of the IER in 1979.

== 'Hatha yoga bien tempéré' ==
Ruchpaul's teaching style, which she calls 'Hatha yoga bien tempéré', (Note: Translation: 'Well-balanced hatha yoga') draws on a rehabilitation method developed by Ruchpaul during his childhood and the teachings of Shivananda. The structure of the postures and breathing techniques is based on the hatha yoga taught by Shivananda in Rishikesh in the early 1950s. Although the postures and breathing exercises are demanding, the Ruchpaul style is considered a form of spiritual hatha yoga: 'Yoga is a return to the self, to the "I am", aham. This encounter with the self gives rise to a state of "contentment", santosha, in the sense of fulfilment'.

This style of hatha yoga, which has been adapted for Western practitioners, can be summarised by three key points: three breathing cycles should be completed between each posture; no posture should be repeated within a single session; just one session should be completed per week.

=== Non-violence ===
Ruchpaul describes her style as 'well-tempered hatha yoga' to emphasise that it is balanced and measured, and free from excess. She situates her style within the Indian tradition, which opposes all forms of violence and excess. This tradition draws on the Yogasūtra (Note: ahimsā: The desire to do no harm and to be non-violent is mentioned in the Yogasutra precepts.) and the Bhagavad Gita. (Note: 'Verily, YOGA is not possible for him who eats too much, nor for him who does not eat at all; nor for him who sleeps too much, nor for him who is (always) awake, O Arjuna.' Bhagavad Gita (6.16)) The reason Ruchpaul places such emphasis on these elements is that they contrast with the Western culture of her pupils, summed up by the Olympic motto, 'Faster, Higher, Stronger'. Her style explicitly rejects performance, competition and pain. This extends to letting go of the desire to perform or achieve well. With the Ruchpaul style, students gradually become aware of the daily mistreatment they inflict on themselves without realising it.

By 'well-tempered', Ruchpaul also means a tailor-made practice that is neither too much nor too little, an allusion to the Middle Way of Buddhism. (Note: A saying attributed to the Buddha: "If you tighten the string too much, it will snap, and if you leave it too slack, it won't play") She anchors this concept in the present moment by speaking of 'yoga according to', a form of yoga that varies according to context: the practitioner's constitution and state, the weather, the place of practice, and so on.

=== Adaptation to Western culture ===
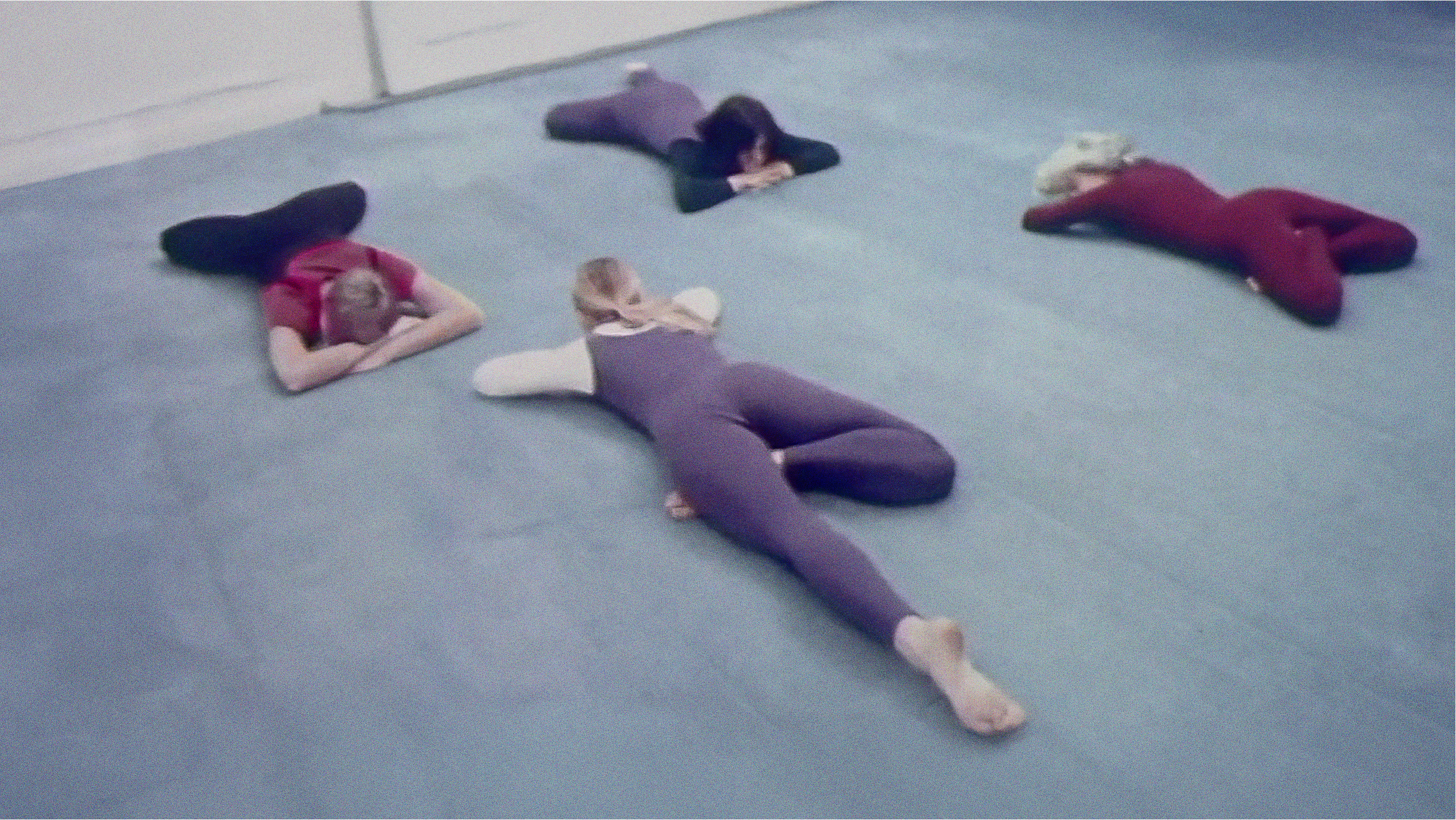
In 1978 at the IER, Éva Ruchpaul and three students in the "poisson sur le ventre" posture ("fish on its belly", variants of Matsyasana, Fish posture)

The Ruchpaul style of hatha yoga is secular and agnostic. As it is not part of Western culture, the Ruchpaul style excludes ritual elements: there are no Sanskrit names for the postures, no 'OM' mantras and no hand mudras. Ruchpaul fears that these rituals might distract Western practitioners. His primary concern is to help practitioners reconnect with their bodies and the ebb and flow of their breath so they can experience the sensation of being alive. She is wary of traditional Sanskrit phrases, which in her view make no sense to beginners and risk provoking resistance. Instead, she uses fresh language and simpler terms to convey their suggested meaning, in order to respect the 'innocence' of beginners and encourage and motivate them without resorting to jargon.

=== The three phases of breathing ===
In the Ruchpaul style, three breathing phases are interspersed with each posture. This is the feature that distinguishes this style. Postures that the body does not encounter in everyday life result in an energy 'debt'. The three breathing phases are primarily intended to settle this 'debt' immediately before moving on to the next posture. Ruchpaul calls the first phase 'the time of nothing at all'. It is a time of silence, during which the practitioner simply allows sensations to arise without intervening. It is a time of non-desire, non-judgement, and non-action. This phase is particularly conducive to experiencing a state of consciousness beyond all mental constructs. The next phase is 'short breaths', when the breathing pattern naturally settles into a steady rhythm in the abdominal area. This is a moment of deliberate neutrality, during which the practitioner observes their breathing without intervening. Whilst completing the recovery, the 'deep breath' phase brings to a close the gradual return to alertness that began in the previous phase. The practitioner inhales to a count of four, allowing the ribcage to open comfortably up to the collarbone, then holds their breath for a count of sixteen. They exhale over a count of eight without emptying their lungs completely, then hold their breath for sixteen counts again. The duration of a count varies so that the practice remains comfortable at all times.

=== Postures ===
According to Ruchpaul, the posture is a state of effortless stillness. Most postures are performed while holding one's breath, either with full or empty lungs. Each posture remains held for the entire duration of the breath hold, which should always be comfortable. Each posture is performed only once. The effect of a posture varies depending on the posture that precedes it and the one that follows it. The teacher selects the postures according to the circumstances, such as the pupils' condition or the weather. When a posture is included in the session, it always occupies the same position in the sequence of postures. The sequence always follows the same progression. After a period of inner listening, preparatory postures are performed, such as the ‘Rocking Preparation’ posture and the Cat. These are followed by postures that open the chest, such as Bow, Locust and Cobra posture. Then, postures that promote blood circulation are performed, such as the 'Declive', Headstand and Bridge. This facilitates the introduction of the Intense Dorsal Stretch, which stretch the back of the body. Next, calming postures are performed, such as Matsyasana and Yoga-mudrā, which provide moments of introspection. To ease the return to active life, invigorating postures are performed, such as Twists and Triangle.

Although the architecture of a posture is unique, the way it is performed can vary depending on factors such as the practitioner’s physique and condition, and the time of year... For example, the locust posture with the feet resting on the head (for a young, hypermobile person) is no better than the one where the feet are raised 20 cm off the ground (for a beginner, an elderly person or someone who is frail, etc.), and the correct way to perform the posture is the one suited to the context.

=== Mindfulness ===
For Ruchapaul, holding a posture is an exercise in mental stability. According to her, 'mind wandering' is the main reason why people hold a posture for a shorter time. The practice incorporates various elements that help to improve mindfulness, even though this concept is not explicitly addressed during the sessions. Holding your breath automatically puts the body into a state of alertness. Scarcity helps to prevent attention from waning; a posture is only held once during a session; and is not necessarily included in every session; as sessions take place weekly, a posture will not be practised more than once a week. Finally, if the posture is suited to the practitioner's level of difficulty, it fosters an attitude of self-awareness.

== Books ==
- 1965 Hatha yoga, la méthode d'enseignement d'une des premières femmes yogis d'Europe. (Note: Translation: Hatha yoga, the teaching method of one of Europe's first female yogis.) Photographs by Philippe Billère. Denoël
- 1969 Philosophie et pratique du yoga. (Note: Translation: Yoga philosophy and practice) Photographs by Matthieu Ricard. Planet edition
- 1975 Philosophie et pratique du yoga. Photographs by Matthieu Ricard. Reprint - updated. Denoël
- 1975 La Demeure du silence (Note: Translation: The House of Silence) Anne Philipe (co-writer). Gallimard. ISBN 9782070292127.
- 1978 Hatha yoga bien tempéré. (Note: Translation: Well-tempered Hatha yoga) Contribution Hélène Bureau; demonstration of the postures by Shanti, Ananda and Éva Ruchpaul, Dominique and Bernard. Photographs by Babu Bommel. Illustrations by Arlette Loquin. Presses universitaires de France (P.U.F.). ISBN 9782130358138
- 1985 Le Hatha yoga. Demonstration of the postures by Ana Maria Magalhães; photographs by Michel Denaison. Reprint - updated. Denoël. ISBN 9782207200810
- 1987 Le Hatha yoga. Demonstration of the postures by Ana Maria Magalhães; photographs by Michel Denaison. Reprint (paperback). Livre de Poche. ISBN 9782253041184
- 2004 Précis de Hatha yoga; stade fondamental. (Note: Translation: Hatha yoga Manual; Fundamental stage) Ellebore. ISBN 9782868980809
- 2004 Précis de Hatha yoga; stade classique. (Note: Translation: Hatha yoga Manual; Classical Stage) Ellebore. ISBN 9782868980793
- 2005 Précis de Hatha yoga; technique avancée. (Note: Translation: Hatha yoga Manual; Advanced technique) Ellebore. ISBN 9782868980816
- 2005 Précis de Hatha yoga; sources et variations. (Note: Translation: Hatha yoga Manual: Sources and Variations) Colette Poggi (co-writer). Ellebore. ISBN 9791023001457

== Video ==
- 1984 Hatha yoga: l'art de se faire. (Note: Translation: Hatha yoga: the art of doing yourself) Director: André Maurice. Yogis: Éva Ruchpaul, Ananda Ruchpaul and Shanti Ruchpaul. Production: Polygram video. Distribution: Warner home video France.

== TV and radio appearances ==
- On December 6, 1966, on France Inter radio, Madame Inter (Annik Beauchamps) interviewed Éva Ruchpaul about yoga.
- On March 29, 1970, Ruchpaul was invited to appear on the program “L'invité du dimanche” on the Office National De Radiodiffusion Télévision Française ORTF. (Note: Translation: French national television network) She demonstrated exercise for beginners to yoga and explained her approach to hatha yoga. Françoise Hardy, a celebrity of the time and a student of Éva Ruchpaul, demonstrates Hatha yoga before answering a few questions on the subject. Éva Ruchpaul then discusses yoga with another celebrity of the time, Georges Moustaki.
- On October 6, 1978, the program 'C'est la vie' on France 2 television aired a 'report devoted to a yoga class taught by one of the first female yogis, Éva Ruchpaul.'
