= Makarasana =

Reclining posture in hatha yoga

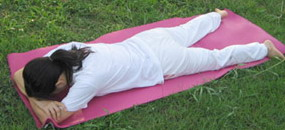
Makarāsana, Crocodile posture, used for relaxation

Makarasana (Sanskrit: मकरासन) or Crocodile pose is a reclining asana in hatha yoga and modern yoga as exercise.

== Etymology and origins ==
The name comes from the Sanskrit मकर makara meaning "crocodile" or "monster", and आसन āsana meaning "posture" or "seat".

Makarasana is described in the 17th-century Gheraṇḍa Saṁhitā (Chapter 2, Verse 40). It is described and illustrated in halftone in the 1905 Yogasopana Purvacatuska.

Makara is commonly translated as crocodile, but has also been assumed to be a sea-creature like a shark or dolphin, and may have been a wholly mythical beast. In Hindu mythology, it was the animal vehicle of the sea-god Varuna, and of the river-goddess Ganga and Narmada. A different myth in the Ramayana tells how Hanuman, seeking to drink from a lake, is seized, pulled under, and swallowed by a crocodile. Hanuman changes shape to become so large that the crocodile bursts, leaving a beautiful apsara nymph named Dhyanamalini who reveals that she had been cursed to become the monster.

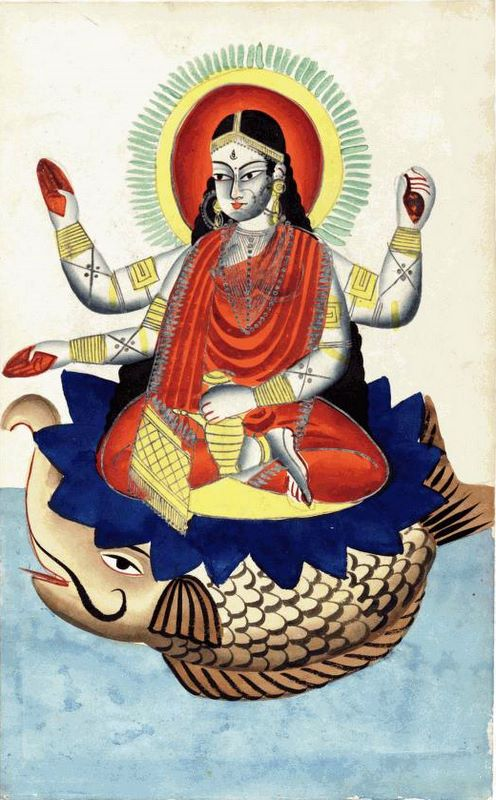
Makara as the Vahana (vehicle) of the river-goddess Ganga and Narmada

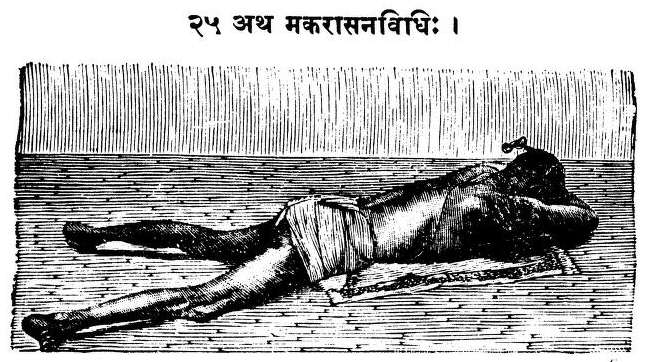
Makarasana in Yogasopana, 1905

== Description ==
In Light on Yoga, B. K. S. Iyengar notes that the Gheranda Samhita describes the pose as lying prone with both legs "stretched out"; the head is caught in the arms, and the pose is said to "increase bodily heat". Iyengar describes it as a variation of Salabhasana, locust pose and illustrates it as such, with the head and legs raised energetically, the fingers interlocked clasping the back of the head, and the elbows high off the ground.

Makarasana is however often used as a relaxation asana, an alternative to the supine Shavasana, and both head and legs are rested on the floor. Yoga International describes it as having the chest "slightly raised", and as "one of the best postures for working with diaphragmatic breathing".

== See also ==
- Bhujangasana, Cobra pose

== Sources ==
- Iyengar, B. K. S. (1979) [1966]. Light on Yoga: Yoga Dipika. Unwin Paperbacks.
