= Dhanurasana =

Reclining posture in hatha yoga

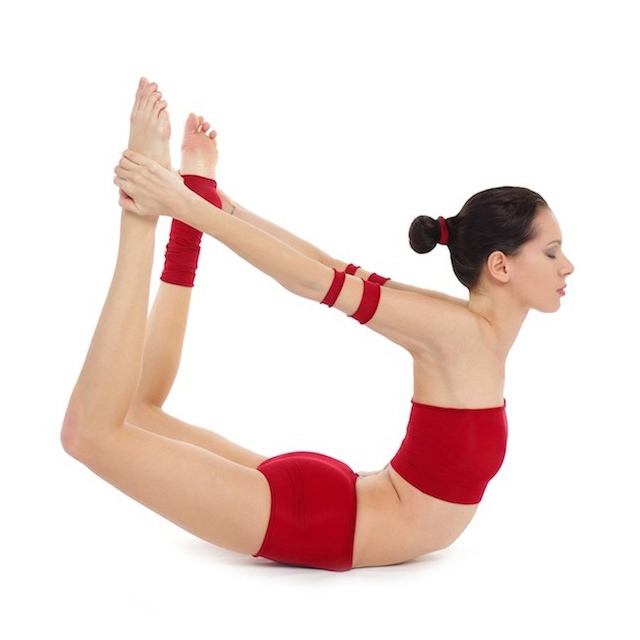
Dhanurasana

Dhanurasana (Sanskrit: धनुरासन, romanized: Dhanurāsana, lit. 'Bow pose') is a back bending asana in hatha yoga and modern yoga as exercise.

== Etymology and origins ==
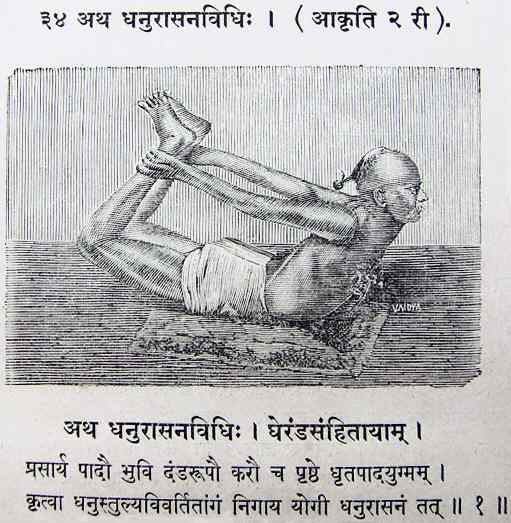
Half-tone engraving of Yogi Ghamande in Dhanurasana in his Yogasopana Purvacatuska, 1905. The text below the image cites the Gheranda Samhita, whose description of the pose is ambiguous.

The name comes from the Sanskrit words धनुर (dhanura) meaning "bow", and आसन (āsana) meaning "posture" or "seat".

A similar pose named Nyubjasana, "the face-down asana", is described and illustrated in the 19th century Sritattvanidhi. The pose is illustrated in half-tone in the 1905 Yogasopana Purvacatuska and named Dhanurāsana, quoting the Gheranda Samhita's description.

It is unclear whether the asana is medieval, as although the name is used, the intended pose might be the sitting Akarna Dhanurasana rather than this backbend. The account of Dhanurasana in the 15th century Hatha Yoga Pradipika is ambiguous about whether the pose is reclining or sitting, stating

Having held the big toes of both feet with both hands, one should pull [them] like a bow as far as the ears. This is called bow pose. (HYP 1.25)

The 17th century Gheranda Samhita is similarly ambiguous, stating

Spreading the legs on the ground, straight like a stick, and catching hold of the feet with the hands, and making the body bent like a bow, is called by the Yogis the Dhanurasana or Bow-posture. (GhS 2.18)

Dhanurasana is used in the classical Indian dance form Bharatanatyam.

== Description ==
From a prone position, the feet are grasped to lift the legs and chest to form the shape of a bow with the body, with the arms representing the bowstring. Balasana (Child) can be used as a counter pose.

== Variations ==
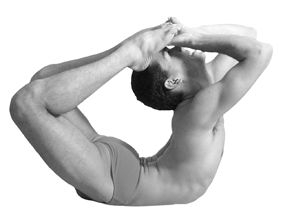
Purna Dhanurasana, a more extreme variant of the pose with the legs brought to the head

Variations include:

- Parsva Dhanurasana, the same pose with the body rolled onto one side.
- Purna Dhanurasana, a more extreme backbend with the legs brought to the head

Counter asanas are Halasana (plough) and Sarvangasana (shoulderstand).

== Modern development ==
The form of Dhanurasana commonly practised today, in which the practitioner lies prone and grasps the ankles or feet from behind, appears to have become established during the modern revival of postural yoga. Earlier descriptions of Dhanurasana are compatible with more than one posture, and historical depictions show both a seated form in which the feet are drawn towards the ears and a prone backbend.

The prone form is depicted in Yogi Ghamande's Yogasopāna-Pūrvacatuṣka (1905), where it is identified with the description of Dhanurasana in the Gheraṇḍasaṃhitā. Ghamande also illustrated a seated form of Dhanurasana elsewhere in the same work, indicating that the name was being applied to more than one posture in the early 20th century.

The prone backbend was subsequently disseminated through 20th-century systems of yoga. It was included in Swami Sivananda's Yoga Asanas, first published in 1934, and became the form generally associated with Dhanurasana in modern yoga.

== See also ==
- Akarna Dhanurasana, a sitting pose resembling an archer shooting an arrow
- Salabhasana, an easier reclining backbend
- Urdhva Dhanurasana, the upwards bow or wheel

== Sources ==
- Iyengar, B. K. S. (1979) [1966]. Light on Yoga: Yoga Dipika. Thorsons. ISBN 978-1855381667.
- Mehta, Silva; Mehta, Mira; Mehta, Shyam (1990). Yoga: The Iyengar Way. Dorling Kindersley. ISBN 978-0863184208.
- Sjoman, Norman E. (1999) [1996]. The Yoga Tradition of the Mysore Palace (2nd ed.). Abhinav Publications. ISBN 81-7017-389-2.
- Vishnudevananda, Swami (1988) [1960]. The Complete Illustrated Book of Yoga. Three Rivers Press. ISBN 0-517-88431-3.
