= Backbend =

Complex movement

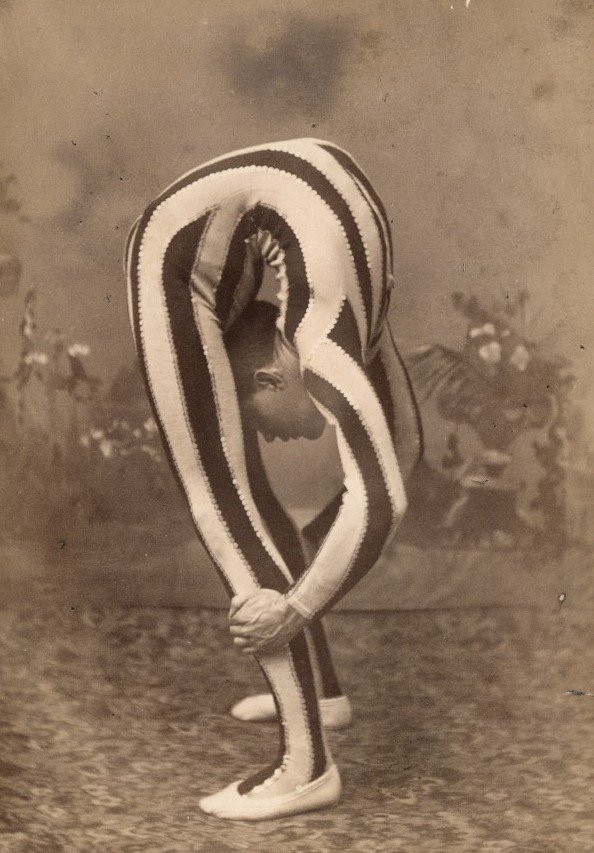
Contortionist doing a backbend

A backbend is a gymnastics, contortion, dance and ice skating move, where the spine is bent backwards, and catching oneself with the hands. Throughout the move, the abdominal muscles, obliques, and legs are used to steady the performer while curving backwards. Modern yoga includes some backbending asanas. Backbending can be acquired from intense training or genetics.

== Overview ==
The spine consists of 24 vertebrae and between the vertebrae are small cushions referred to as disks. The movement of the vertebrae and the compression ability of the disks give the spine its flexibility.

It is easier to perform a backbend after mastering a bridge. A bridge helps familiarize the bones and muscles to the positions and movements of a backbend.

There are over a dozen yoga positions that are variant of the backbend. A "rib thrust" is common and deleterious to a good yoga pose, and one of the more common of several errors associated with the backbend.

== Uses ==
The backbend is important in gymnastics because it is essential to perform a back handspring.

Backbends are part of the repertoire of professional and competitive ice skaters. For example, a backbend was performed by Jimmie Santee in the 1994 production of Walt Disney's World on Ice: Aladdin. Backbends and other contortions were a feature of the performance of Mr. Frick from the 1930s ice comedy act Frick and Frack.

== Injuries ==
When performed correctly, backbends can increase the range of motion of the spine. However, there is a significant risk of injury. These injuries include low back pain, injuries to the spinal discs, muscle spasms and paralysis; In 2016, a 5-year-old girl from Los Angeles became paralysed after attempting a backbend that resulted in damage to numerous areas of her spine.

== Backbending asanas ==
Modern yoga includes backbending asanas such as the kneeling Kapotasana and Ustrasana, the inverted Urdhva Dhanurasana, and the sitting Rajakapotasana. These are described as "strenuous" poses, and should be worked on gently by beginners or people with stiff backs to avoid injury. The spine can be released after backbending asanas with twisting asanas such as Marichyasana and Matsyendrasana, or by forward bends such as Janusirsasana, practised gently.

== See also ==
- Flexibility
