= Marichyasana =

Seated twisting posture in modern yoga

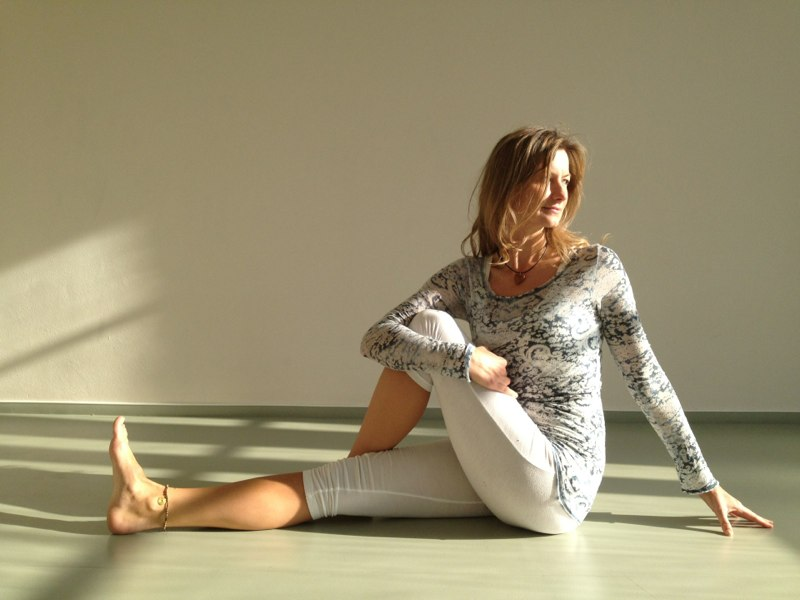
Marichyasana I

Marichyasana (Sanskrit: मरीच्यासन; IAST: Maricyāsana, the pose of the sage Marichi) is a sitting twist asana in modern yoga as exercise, in some forms combined with a forward bend.

== Etymology and origins ==
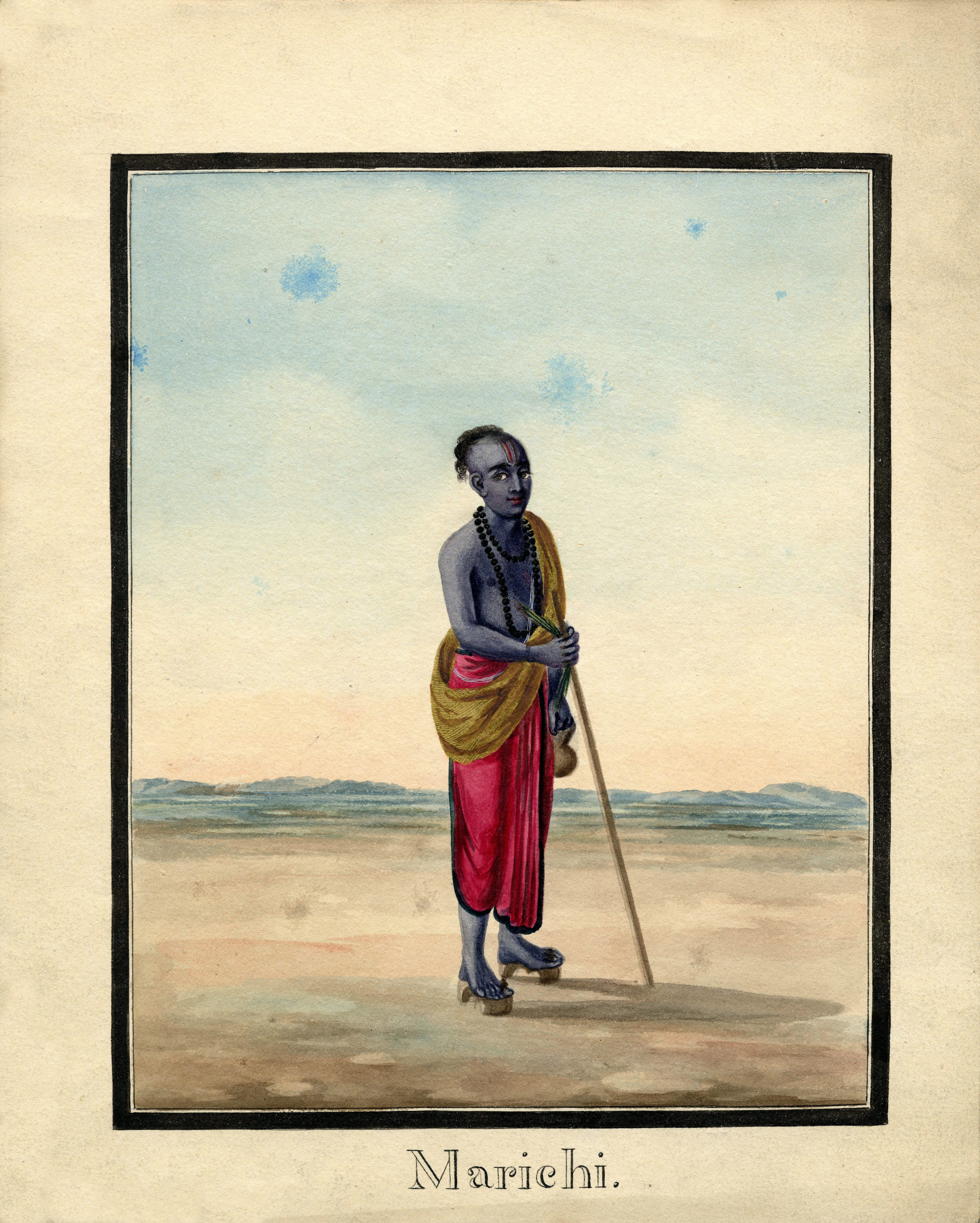
Marichi, a Rishi and son of Brahma. Early 19th century watercolour

The name of the pose is from Sanskrit मरीचि Marichi, the name of a sage in Hindu mythology, and आसन, āsana, meaning posture or seat.

The pose is not found in medieval hatha yoga texts, but is described in Krishnamacharya's 1934 Yoga Makaranda and in the teaching of his pupils, B. K. S. Iyengar and Pattabhi Jois.

== Description ==
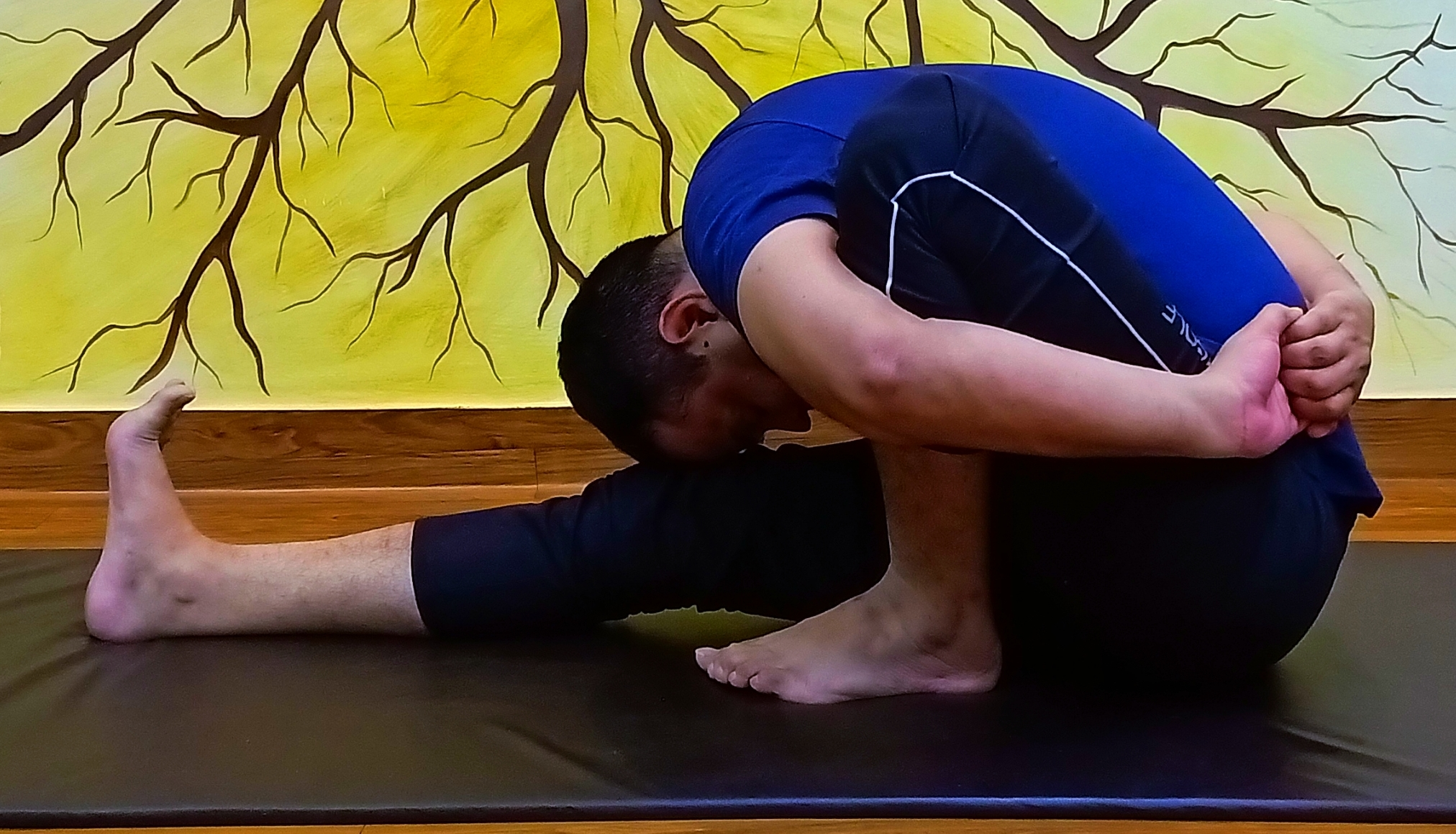
Marichyasana I

This twisting asana is normally performed sitting. In Marichyasana I, one leg is stretched out straight ahead of the body, the other is bent with the sole of the foot on the floor and the knee up beside the body. The body is twisted towards the side with the straight leg, and the arms are clasped behind the back and around the raised knee. The body may then lean forwards until the nose and chin touch the straight leg.

== Variations ==
In Marichyasana II, the leg on the ground is folded as for padmasana (lotus), while the other leg is bent as in Marichyasana I; the body is twisted towards the leg on the ground, and the arms are clasped behind the back and around the raised knee. The body may then be leant forwards until the chin touches the knee that is resting on the ground.

In Marichyasana III, the leg on the ground is stretched out straight. The body is twisted towards the side with the bent leg, and again the arms are clasped behind the back and around the raised knee.

Marichyasana IV puts together the movements of Marichyasana II and III. The leg on the ground is folded as for padmasana; the body is twisted towards the raised knee.

This asana may also be performed standing, the foot of the bent leg resting on the seat of a chair and the body turned across the bent leg to face a wall.

== Benefits ==
Standing Marichyasana is stated to be helpful in relieving backache.

== See also ==
- Bharadvajasana, a seated twist with both knees on the floor
- Jathara Parivartanasana, a reclining twist with both knees to one side
- Matsyendrasana, a seated twist with one knee up

== Sources ==
- Iyengar, B. K. S. (1979) [1966]. Light on Yoga: Yoga Dipika. Thorsons. ISBN 978-1855381667.
- Mehta, Silva; Mehta, Mira; Mehta, Shyam (1990). Yoga: The Iyengar Way. Dorling Kindersley.
