= Matsyasana =

Reclining back-bending posture in hatha yoga

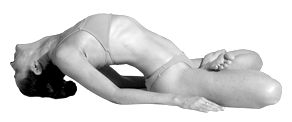
Matsyasana is a reclining backbend, here with the legs crossed in padmasana.

Matsyasana (Sanskrit: मत्स्यासन; IAST: Matsyāsana) or Fish pose is a reclining back-bending asana in hatha yoga and modern yoga as exercise.

== Etymology and origins ==
The name comes from the Sanskrit words matsya (मत्स्य) meaning "fish" and asana (आसन) meaning "posture" or "seat".

The asana is medieval, described in the 17th century Gheraṇḍa Saṃhitā 2.21.

== Description ==
The asana is a backbend, where the practitioner lies on their back and lifts the heart (anahata) chakra by rising up on the elbows and drawing the shoulders back. The neck is lengthened, and the crown of the head Sahasrara chakra is "pointed" toward the 'wall' behind the practitioner. As the arch of the back deepens with practice, and the heart and throat open further, the top of the head may brush the ground, but no weight should rest upon it. The legs are crossed in padmasana or an easier cross-legged pose.

Within the Ashtanga (vinyasa) yoga Primary Series, it is considered a counterpose to Sarvangasana, shoulder stand.

== Variations ==
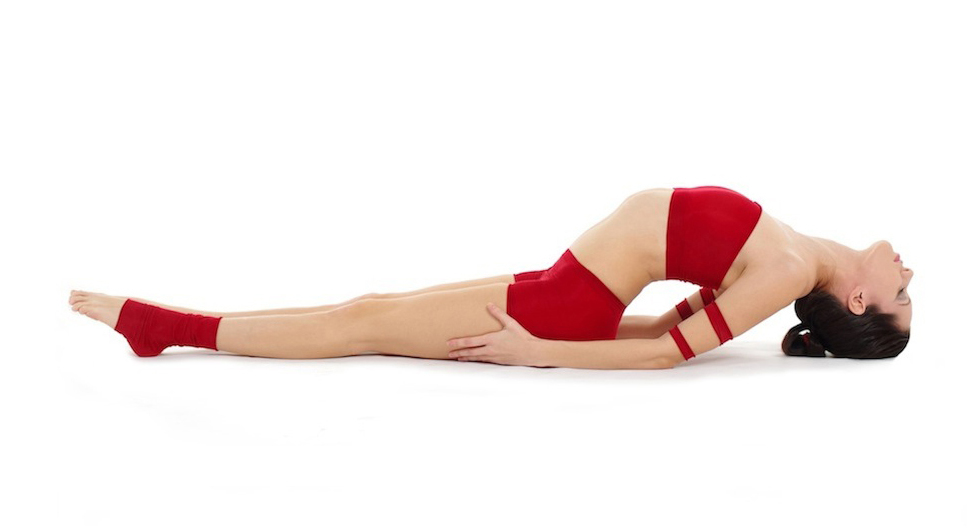
variant with straight legs

- The legs can be kept straight on the ground, or with knees bent and feet on the floor, for practitioners unable to do Padmasana with the legs.
- The legs again straight can be lifted off the ground, for a "challenging variation".
- The hands may be placed before the heart in Añjali Mudrā, making the pose more difficult.

The pose can be supported with a bolster under the back, and with a cushion under the knees.
