= Bharadvajasana =

Seated twisting posture in modern yoga

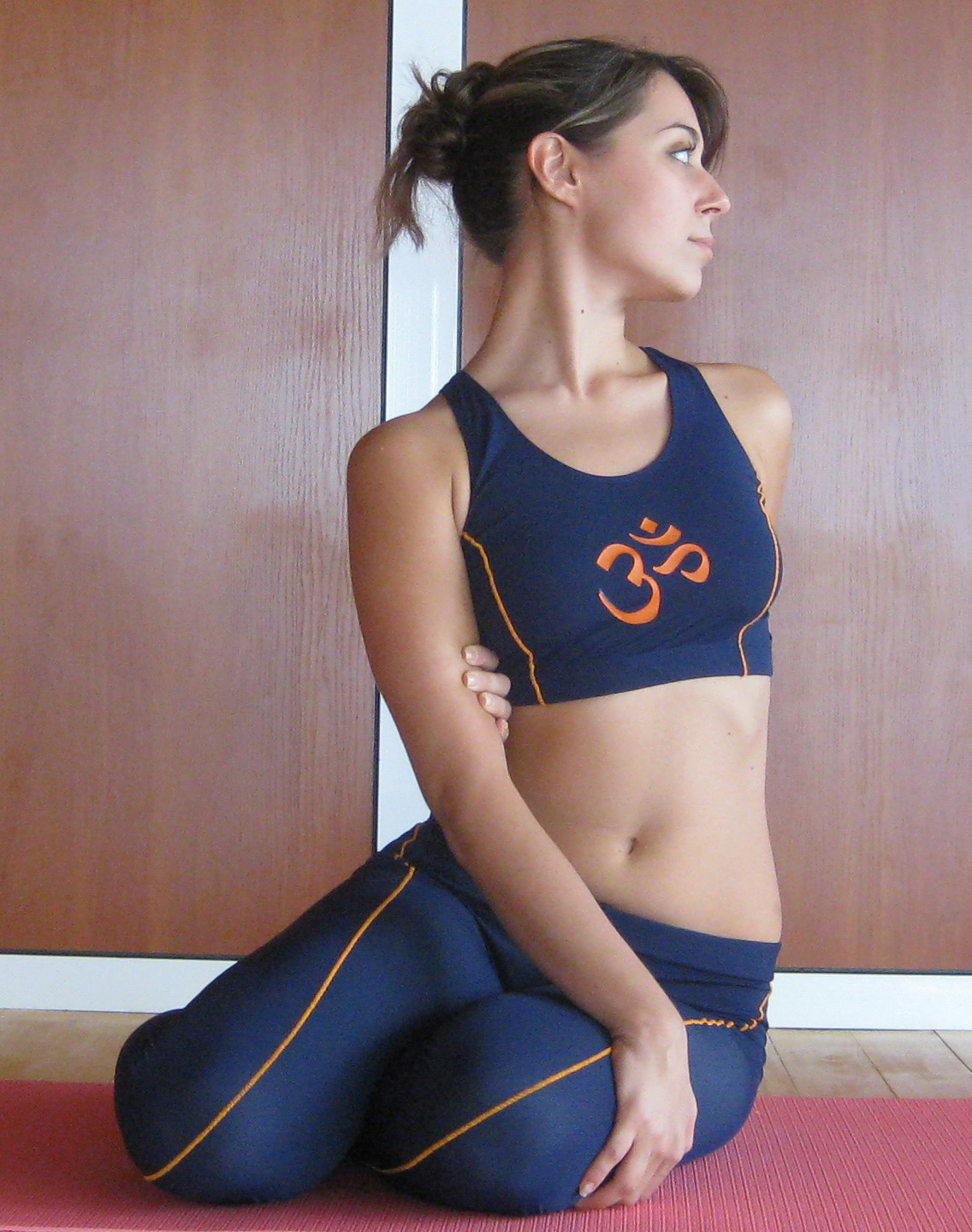
Bharadvajasana I from the front

Bharadvajasana (Sanskrit: भरद्वाजासन; IAST: Bharadvājāsana) or Bharadvaja's twist is a twisting asana in modern yoga as exercise.

== Etymology and origins ==
The asana is dedicated to the sage Bharadvāja who was one of the Seven Great Sages or Rishi. He was the father of Drona, a master of military arts and the royal guru to Kauravas, Pandavas and the Devastras, the princes who fought the great war of the Mahabharata.

A different asana is illustrated under the name Bharadvajasana in the 19th century Sritattvanidhi; it somewhat resembles Mayurasana with the legs in Padmasana, but as drawn it would be impossible to perform.

The pose currently known by the name Bharadvajasana is a modern one, first seen in the 20th century. It is described in the works of two of Krishnamacharya's pupils, B. K. S. Iyengar's 1966 Light on Yoga and Pattabhi Jois's Ashtanga (vinyasa) yoga.

== Description ==
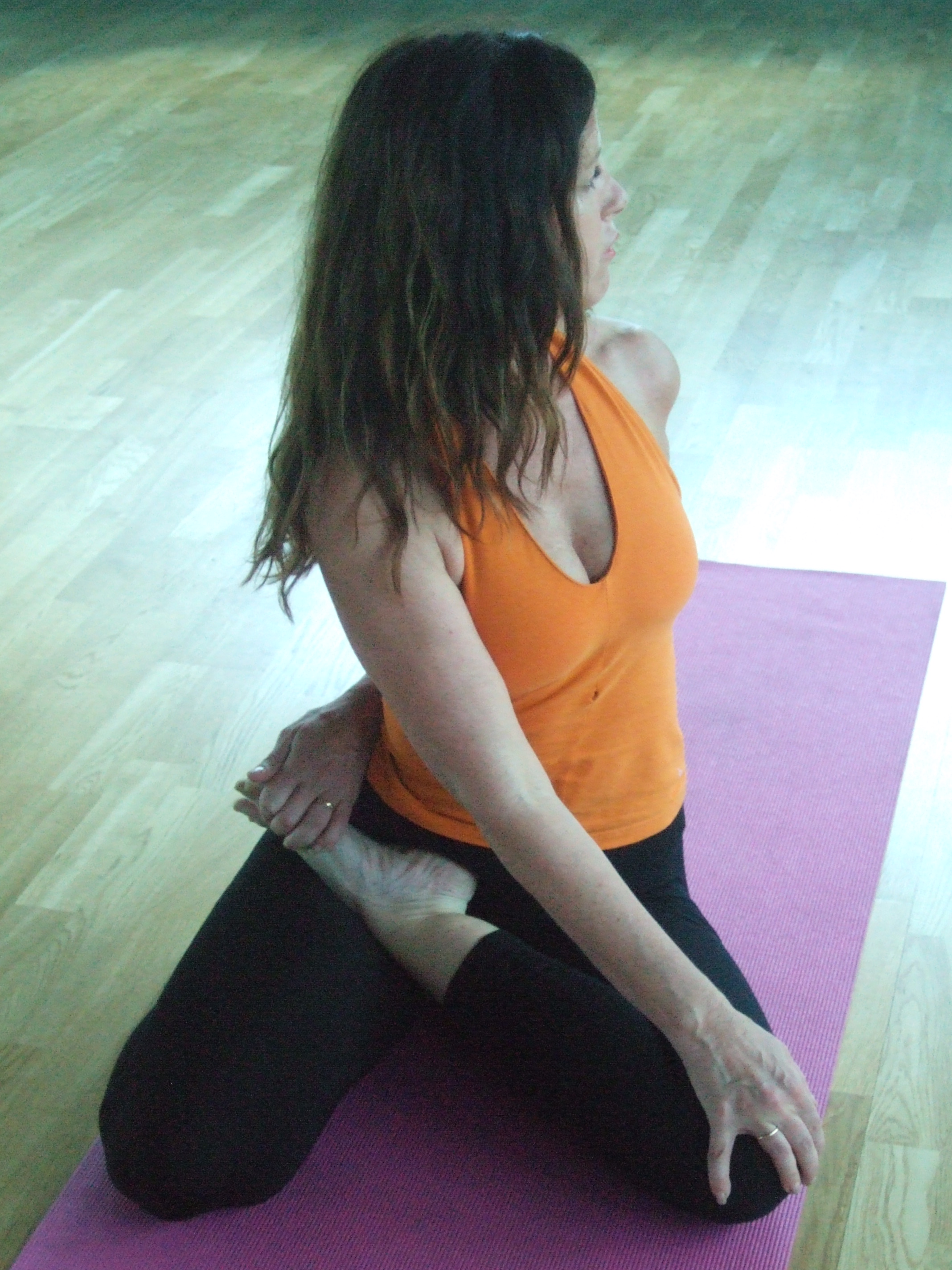
Bharadvajasana II

Bharadvājāsana is a seated spinal twist. Bharadvajasana I is the basic form, with the legs as in Virasana (hero pose), one foot on the floor and the other ankle cradled in the arch of the foot below. Baddha Konasana and Marichyasana can be used to prepare for Bharadvajasana. Utthita Trikonasana, extended triangle pose, is a suitable counter pose to Bharadvajasana.

== Variations ==
Bharadvajasana II is an advanced form requiring high hip mobility; one leg is bent as in Padmasana (lotus position), while the other leg is bent as in Virasana.

Bharadvajasana on chair is a variant performed sitting sideways on an armless chair. This does not require hip mobility; the arms grasp the back of the chair to assist with the twist.

== See also ==
- Marichyasana, a sitting twist with one leg straight
- Matsyendrasana, a sitting twist with one knee up

== Sources ==
- Dehnke, Andrea (2012). "Bharadvaja's Twist". Yoga Journal.
- Hopkins, Edward Washburn (1915). Epic Mythology. Noble Offset Printers. ISBN 978-0819602282.
- Iyengar, B. K. S. (1979). Light on Yoga. Schocken. ISBN 978-0-8052-1031-6.
- Mehta, Silva; Mehta, Mira; Mehta, Shyam (1990). Yoga: The Iyengar Way. Dorling Kindersley.
- Sjoman, Norman E. (1999). The Yoga Tradition of the Mysore Palace. Abhinav Publications. ISBN 978-81-7017-389-2.
