= Viparita Karani =

Inverted posture in hatha yoga

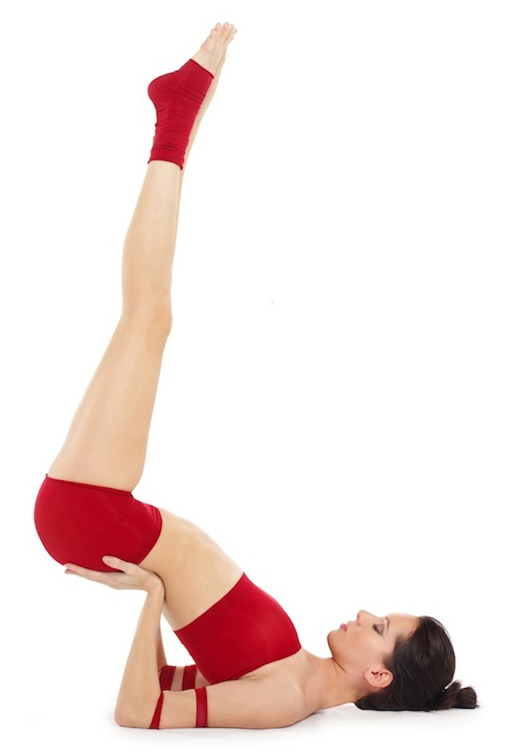
Viparita Karani, with extension in the spine

Viparita Karani (Sanskrit: विपरीतकरणी; IAST: viparītakaraṇī) or legs up the wall pose is both an asana and a mudra in hatha yoga. In modern yoga as exercise, it is commonly a fully supported pose using a wall and sometimes a pile of blankets, where it is considered a restful practice. As a mudra it was practised using any preferred inversion, such as a headstand or shoulderstand. The purpose of the mudra was to reverse the downward flow of vital fluid being lost from the head, using gravity.

== Etymology and origins ==
The name comes from the Sanskrit words विपरीत viparīta, "inverted" or "reversed", and करणी karaṇī, "a particular type of practice".

The practice is described in the 13th century Vivekamārtaṇḍa (verses 103–131) as a means of yogic withdrawal, pratyahara. The pose was practised from the 17th century onwards in hatha yoga under names such as Narakasana, Kapalasana and Viparitakaranasana; its purpose as a mudra was to reverse the downflow and loss of the life-giving substance (Bindu) through the use of gravity. In the early Bindu Model of Hatha Yoga, as described in the Hatha Yoga Pradipika and other texts, the vital fluid is held in the head but constantly drips down and is lost. Mudras were thought to block the central sushumna nadi channel of the subtle body and work to force the flow back up, or in the case of Viparita Karani actually to reverse the flow. A headstand is described and illustrated in halftone as Viparita Karani in the 1905 Yogasopana Purvacatuska.

Early Bindu Model of Hatha Yoga, as described in the Hatha Yoga Pradipika and other texts. Mudras such as Viparita Karani can reverse the flow, stopping the loss of vital fluid.

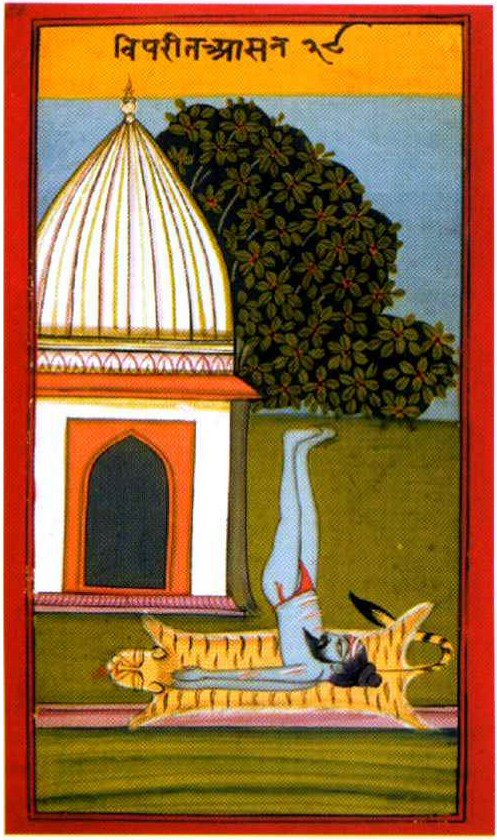
Viparita Karani using a shoulderstand from an illustrated manuscript of the Joga Pradipika, 1830

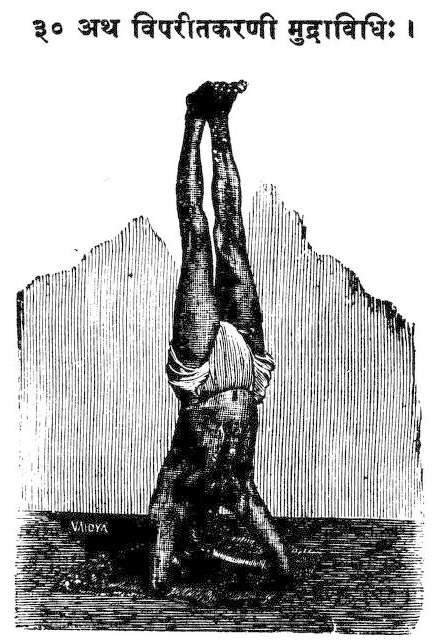
Viparita Karani using a headstand in Yogasopana Purvacatuska, 1905

== Description ==
Viparita Karani can be any practice where one is upside down. This can include the asanas of shoulder stand (Sarvangasana), headstand (Sirsasana), or handstand (Adho Mukha Vrksasana). In the Hatha Yoga Pradipika, as in most classical texts on haṭha yoga, Viparita Karani is listed as a mudra, meaning its purpose is to direct energy within the body, as opposed to asanas which are used in the Hatha Yoga Pradipika to create steadiness.

In one popular expression of Viparita Karani as an asana in modern postural yoga, it resembles Salamba Sarvāngāsana (supported shoulder stand) but with extension in the thoracic spine (rather than the cervical spine), elbows on the floor and hands supporting hips or lower back.

== Variations ==
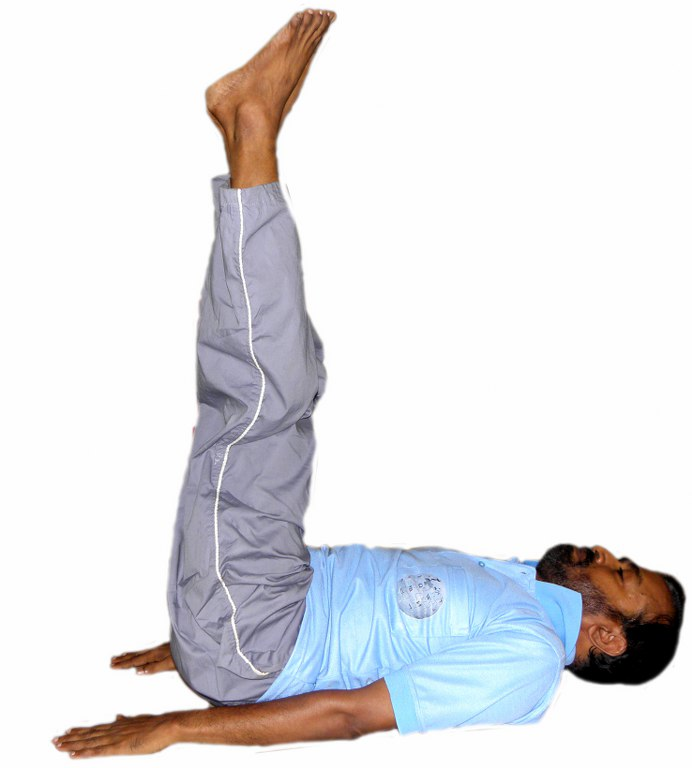
Uttanapadasana

Viparita Karani is treated as a resting pose in Iyengar Yoga, where it is also called "Legs-up-the-Wall Pose". The school describes this as "a restful practice, where the body is inverted without effort", and the lower back and buttocks are supported with a pile of blankets, while the legs are rested against a wall, either together or allowed to fall outwards into a straddle. In Sivananda yoga, the pose is said to be suitable for pregnancy, in the form of "Wall Butterfly": the buttocks and feet are placed against a wall, with the feet together as in Baddha Konasana, the knees falling to the sides. The hands can be used to press the knees.

A similar pose is Uttanapadasana, meaning "stretch leg pose", where the back rests on the floor and the legs point straight up, either against a wall, supported with a strap, or free. Another related pose is Urdhva Prasarita Padasana, where the back is on the ground, the arms are stretched out on the floor above the head, and the legs are raised either partly or to the vertical.

== Benefits ==
Sivananda yoga describes wall stretches including Wall Butterfly as helpful in pregnancy, since they "open up the pelvis". Cyndi Lee writes that Viparita Karani with the pelvis raised on folded blankets allows lymph to drain from the legs, relieving fatigue there. She adds that the real benefit of the pose, however, is that it provides an experience of the value of "doing less, not more": practising receptivity in place of action. It is thus not just a physical inversion, but it "invert[s] the whole notion of action".

== Sources ==
- Mallinson, James; Singleton, Mark (2017). Roots of Yoga. Penguin Books. ISBN 978-0-241-25304-5. OCLC 928480104.
- Mehta, Silva; Mehta, Mira; Mehta, Shyam (1990). Yoga: The Iyengar Way. Dorling Kindersley.
