= Jathara Parivartanasana =

Reclining twisting posture in modern yoga

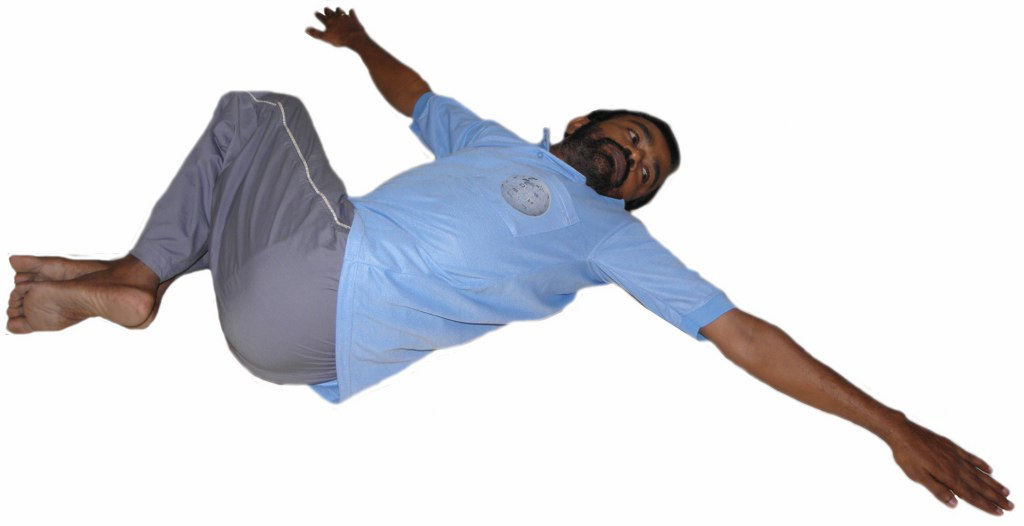
Jathara Parivartanasana, variant with knees bent

Jathara Parivartanasana (Sanskrit: जठर परिवर्तनासन), Revolved Abdomen pose, Belly twist, or Spinal twist (Note: Matsyendrasana, a seated pose.) is a reclining twist asana in modern yoga as exercise.

== Etymology and origins ==
The name is from the Sanskrit जठर Jaṭhara, stomach or abdomen; परिवर्तन Parivartana, to turn around; and आसन āsana, posture or seat. The pose is not found in medieval hatha yoga texts, but is described in 20th century manuals including B. K. S. Iyengar's 1966 Light on Yoga.

== Description ==
The full pose, sometimes called Jathara Parivartanasana B, is entered from a supine position, with the arms outspread on the ground, level with the shoulders. For the full pose, the legs are raised straight up and then lowered to one side, keeping the opposite shoulder on the ground.

In Ashtanga (vinyasa) yoga, the pose is used cautiously, in combination with deep muscle exercises, to help relieve low back pain: it is not sufficient on its own as the strength of core muscles along the spine also needs to be developed.

== Variations ==
For an easier pose, sometimes called Jathara Parivartanasana A, the knees are bent over the body, and rotated to one side; the legs may then be straightened.

In Iyengar Yoga, the hips are moved a little away from the side the legs will descend before the rotation. A weight may be held in the hand on the opposite side. The pose may also be practised with the legs descending half-way down.

== See also ==
- Supta Matsyendrasana – a similar supine spinal twist, one leg remaining straight out on the ground

== Sources ==
- Iyengar, B. K. S. (1979) [1966]. Light on Yoga: Yoga Dipika. Thorsons. ISBN 978-1855381667.
- Mehta, Silva; Mehta, Mira; Mehta, Shyam (1990). Yoga: The Iyengar Way. Dorling Kindersley. ISBN 978-0863184208.
