= Headstand =

Pose that is an inversion posture of standing head down

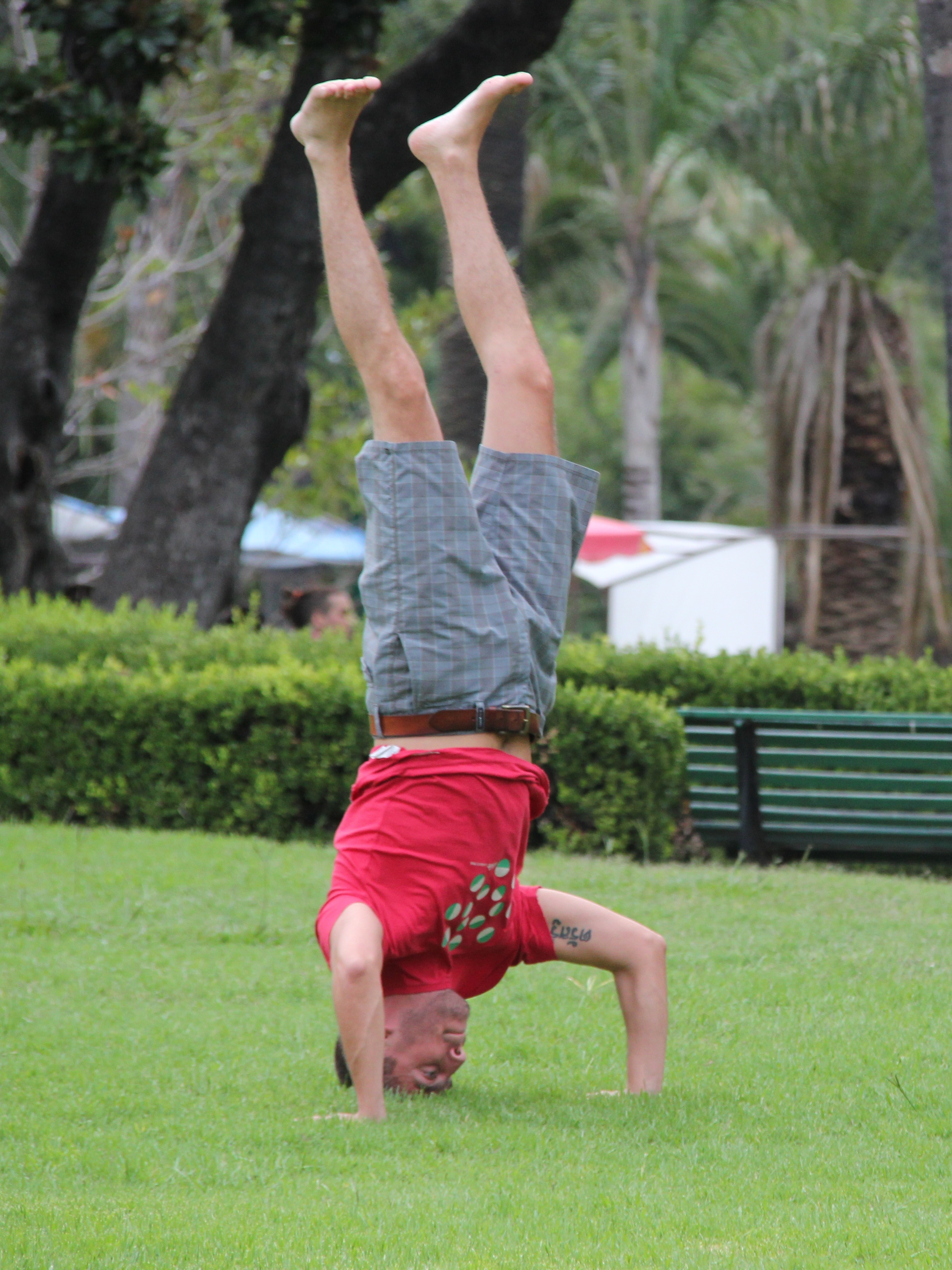
Man doing a headstand in a park in Buenos Aires

The headstand, or sometimes head stand, is a pose that is an inversion posture of standing head down. The technique is used in different settings such as yoga, breakdancing, acrobatics and beginner gymnastics.

== How to practice headstand ==
- Start from kneeling position on mat and put your forearms on the floor in front of you.
- Weave your fingers together and lie on your head, making a stable “tripod” with your hands and head.
- Pressure your hips and straighten your legs, under your toes, until your hips are vertically above your shoulders.
- Engage your core and peel your legs off the ground at the very start when moving them towards the ceiling.
- Keep the steady position between your hands or to your toes and don’t let your head go down, but rather keep a straight line from head to heels.
- Breathe for a few moments, then gradually add duration to your pose with your strength and comfort level growing.
- To exit the pose, lower the legs slowly back down with the support of your hands and then lower yourself to a kneeling position.

== Health risks ==
- If the headstand is not done perfectly, the performer is likely to suffer head injury from standing on the head.
- If one is suffering from high blood pressure, one should avoid performing a headstand.

== In yoga ==
The yoga headstand, Shirshasana, may be balanced and symmetrical from all perspectives, even though not always in a legs-vertical position. The asana has many variations, several of them asymmetrical.

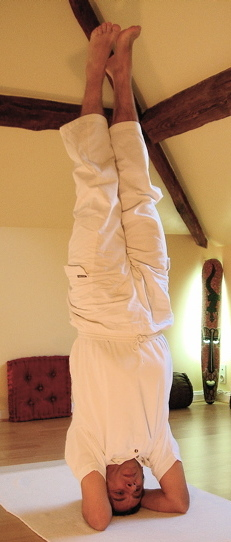
Yoga headstand, Shirshasana

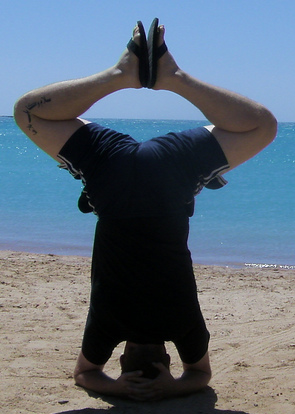
With feet as in Baddha Konasana

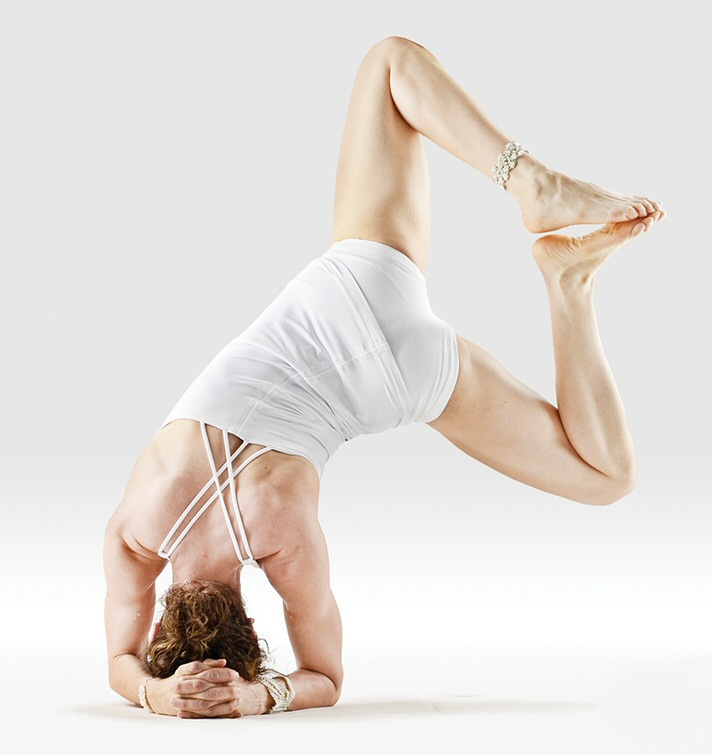
A variation

== See also ==
- Handstand
