= Yogasopana Purvachatushka =

First hatha yoga manual with halftone illustrations

Yogasopana
- Front cover: Ghamande demonstrating the yoga pose Matsyendrasana
- Author: Yogi Narayana Ghamande
- Illustrator: Purusottam Sadashiv Joshi
- Language: Marathi
- Subject: Asanas
- Genre: Hatha yoga manual
- Publisher: Janardan Mahadev Gurjar, Niranayasagar Press
- Publication date: 1905
- Publication place: India
- Pages: 110

The Yogasopana Purvachatushka (Marathi: योगसोपान पूर्वचतुष्क (in Devanagari script)) or Stairway to Yoga is a 1905 book in Marathi on hatha yoga by Yogi Narayana Ghamande. It describes and illustrates 37 asanas including Matsyendrasana and Sarvangasana, along with mudras such as Viparita Karani. It was the first and probably the only textbook on yoga to be illustrated with halftone plates. It was influential as the first illustrated yoga textbook to be printed. The book was transitional in several ways: from traditional secrecy to public access to hatha yoga's practices; from symbolic to naturalistic representation of the yoga body, its halftone engravings forming a halfway house between painting and photography; and from spiritual description to art.

== Book ==
The Yogasopana Purvachatushka is written in the style of an instruction manual. It covers yoga in terms of Patanjali's eight limbs of yoga, with sections on the yamas (prohibitions), niyamas (observances), asanas (postures), and pranayama (breath control). It describes 37 asanas including Dhanurasana, Kukkutasana, Matsyendrasana, Mayurasana, and Sarvangasana, along with mudras such as Mahamudra and Viparita Karani. Each posture is illustrated with a halftone plate by Purusottam Sadashiv Joshi of the author, Yogi Narayana Ghamande, demonstrating the practice.

The book is written in Marathi and published in Bombay (now Mumbai) in 1905 by Janārdana Mahādeva Gurjara at Nirṇayasāgara Press. A translation into Hindi, with verses in Sanskrit, was published in 1906. Further editions were brought out in India, including in 1927 and 1951.

== Analysis ==
=== A transitional book ===
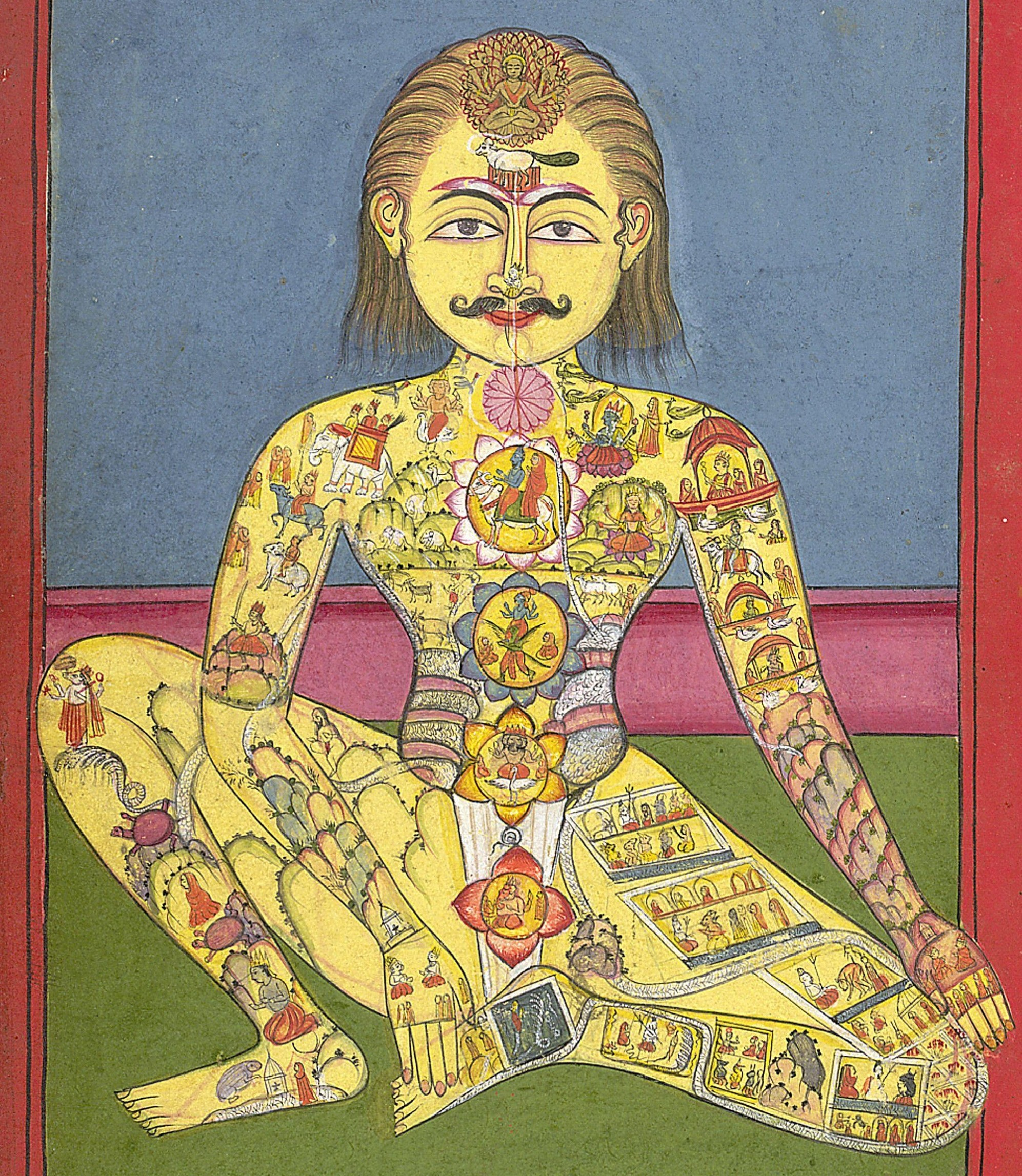
Symbolic portrayal of the subtle body and its seven chakras in the Jogapradīpikā, a few years before Yogasopana, 1899

The yoga scholar Mark Singleton writes that the publication of Yogasopana was in several ways a "key transitional moment" from medieval hatha yoga to modern yoga as exercise. For the first and probably also the last time, the yogic body was represented naturalistically, using modern halftone engravings, as a muscled, three-dimensional body in physical postures. This was a radical break from centuries of hatha yoga tradition, in which the body was painted symbolically, to show invisible features such as the subtle body with its chakras, inside a drawn outline of the body, filled in purely by colouring or decoration with no attempt to show the body as a solid object. In addition, the book represents a radical break from hatha yoga's tradition of secrecy, with knowledge of techniques transmitted only from a guru to his disciple. Influenced by photography, which soon followed in a series of yoga manuals by other authors, the images in Yogasopana, engraved by the artisan Purusottam Sadashiv Joshi, accurately represent the gradations of light and shade on Ghamande's body as he executes the asanas. Steven Greenberg of the United States National Library of Medicine describes Yogasopana as "a small book, modestly printed, whose influence belies its humble appearance" and "a key transitional text" in yoga's history.

Mark Singleton's analysis of transitional features of the Yogasopana
Feature	In earlier works	Yogasopana	In later works
Openness	Secretive, guru-to-disciple transmission	First self-help manual in hatha yoga	Open, public sharing of knowledge
Artwork	Either absent or, as in the Jogapradīpikā, purely conceptual, drawn decoration of subtle body with nadis, chakras, body as outline	Perceptual, showing a real body (Ghamande's); first, possibly the only use of halftone in hatha yoga	Photographs or drawings of real bodies

=== Innovations ===
In the museum curator Debra Diamond's view, the book "was conceived as a work of art", not just as a practically useful guide to the illustrated asanas, and it was "self-consciously modern".

The yoga teacher and researcher Laura Denham-Jones calls the book one of the early yoga asana self-help manuals; she notes that Ghamande "even provided his address so that students could write to him with any questions." Ghamande was, Singleton observes, consciously acknowledging and breaking the hatha yoga rule of secrecy, with the "somewhat sophistic" justification that "nobody says from whom you have to keep it secret, nor how much you have to hide".

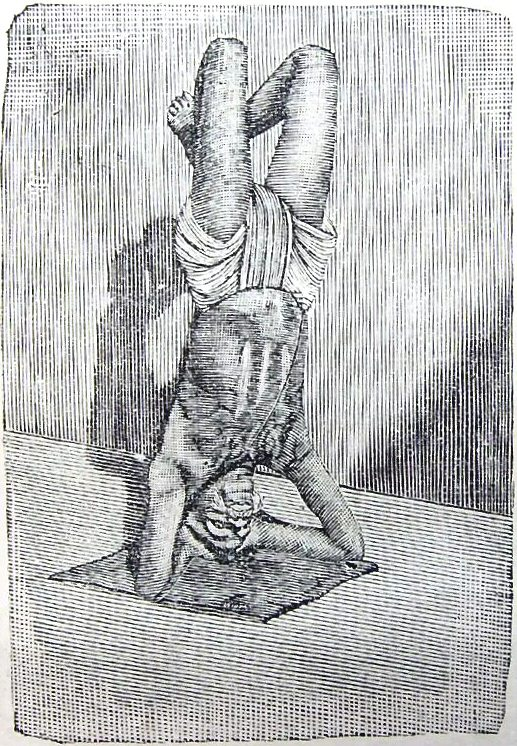
Ardhavrikshasana, a variant of Shirshasana

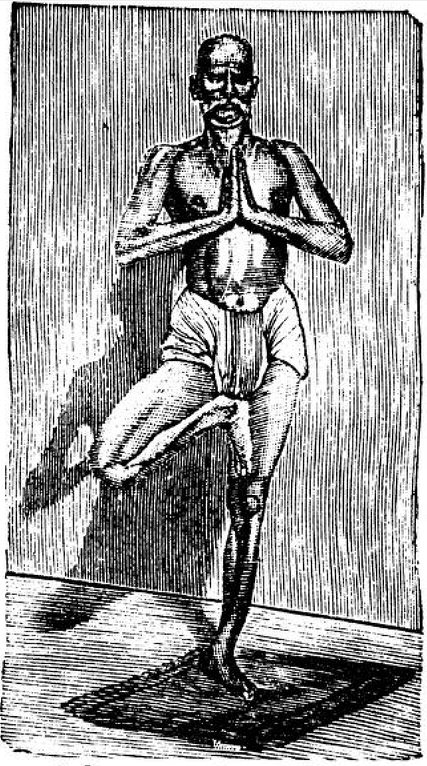
Vrikshasana

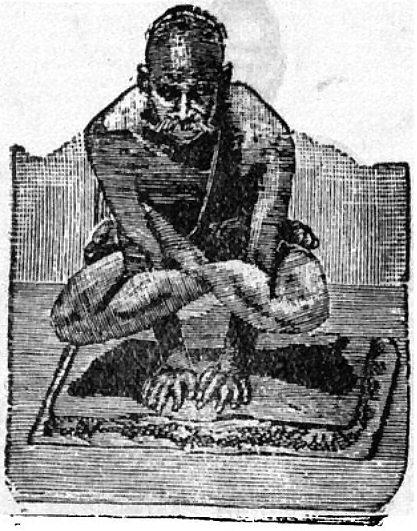
Kukkutasana
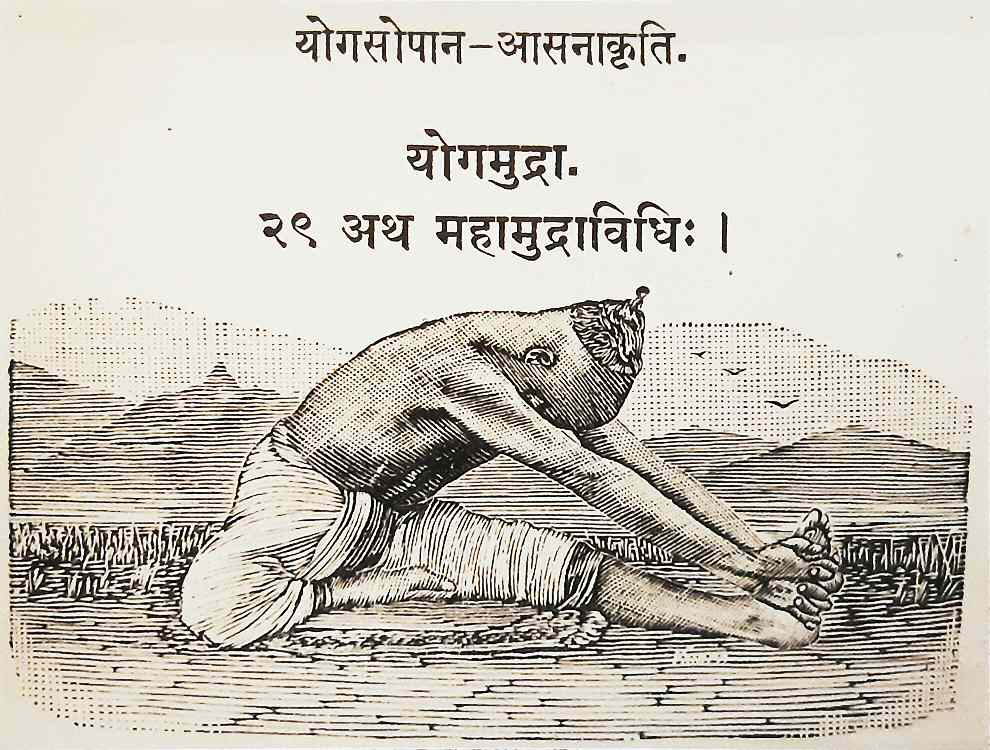
Mahamudra

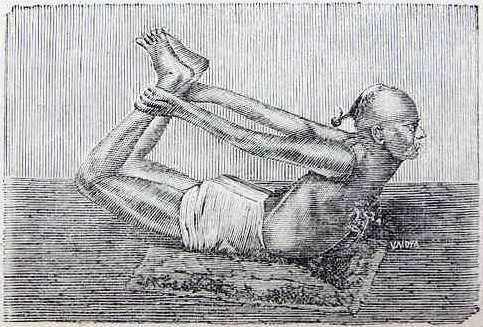
Dhanurasana

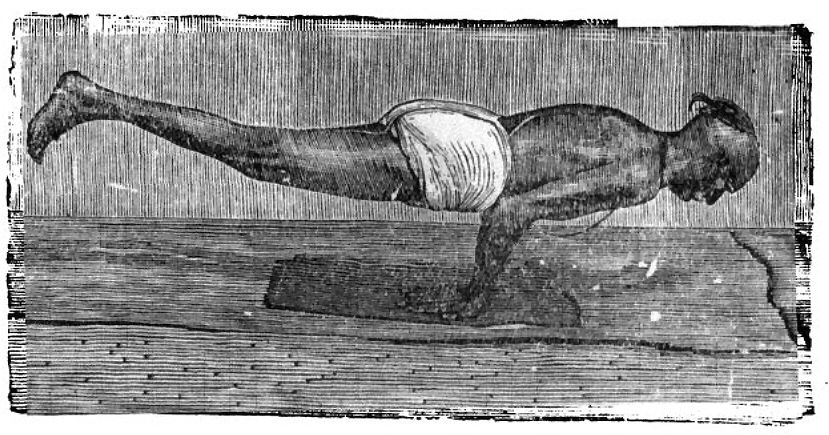
Mayurasana

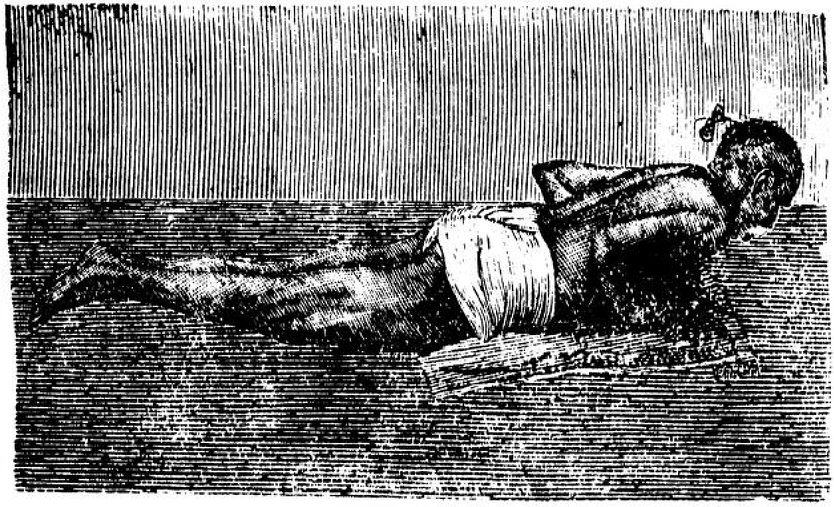
Salabhasana

== Sources ==
- Ghamande, Narayana (1905). Yogasopana Purvachatushca (in Marathi) (1st ed.). Bombay: Janardan Mahadev Gurjar, Niranayasagar Press.
- ——— (1906). Yogasopana Purvachatushca (in Hindi). Bombay: Janardan Mahadev Gurjar, Niranayasagar Press.
- ——— (1927). Yogasopana Purvachatushca (in Marathi). Bombay: Janardan Mahadev Gurjar, Niranayasagar Press.
- ——— (1951). Yogasopana Purvachatushca (3rd ed.). Bombay: Tukarama Book Depot.
- Singleton, Mark (2010). Yoga Body : the origins of modern posture practice. Oxford University Press. ISBN 978-0-19-539534-1. OCLC 318191988.
