= Shirshasana =

Yoga headstand, an inverted posture in hatha yoga

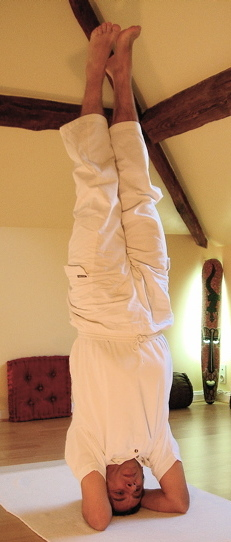
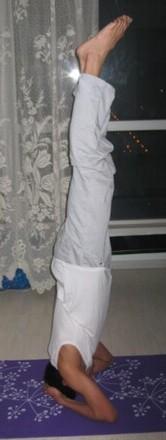
Shirshasana from front and side

Shirshasana (Sanskrit: शीर्षासन, IAST: śīrṣāsana), salamba shirshasana, or yoga headstand, is an inverted asana in yoga as exercise. In classical hatha yoga, it was described as both an asana and a mudra under different names. Shirshasana has been called the king of all asanas. Its many variations can be combined into Mandalasana, in which the legs are progressively swept from one headstand variation to another in a full circle around the body.

== Etymology ==
The name Salamba Shirshasana comes from the Sanskrit words सालम्ब Sālamba meaning "supported", शीर्ष, Śīrṣa meaning "head", and आसन, Āsana meaning "posture" or "seat".

== Historical practices ==
The name Śīrṣāsana is relatively recent; the pose itself is much older, and like other inversions was practised as Viparita Karani, described as a mudra in the 15th century Hatha Yoga Pradipika and other classical texts on haṭha yoga. Viparita Karani, "the Inverter", holds the head down and the feet up for hours at a time, so as to cause gravity to retain the prana. The practice is claimed by the 13th century Dattatreya Yoga Shastra to destroy all diseases, to increase the digestive fire, and to banish signs of ageing. The pose is described and illustrated in halftone as Viparita Karani in the 1905 Yogasopana purvacatusca.

Hemacandra's 11th century Yogaśāstra calls the pose Duryodhanāsana ("Duryodhana's pose") or Kapālīkarana ("head technique"). The 18th century Joga Pradīpikā calls it Kapālī āsana, head posture; it is number 17 of the set of 84 asanas described and illustrated in the work. However, the 19th century Sritattvanidhi uses the name Śīrṣāsana as well as Kapālāsana, while the Malla Purana, a 13th-century manual for wrestlers, names but does not describe 18 asanas including Śīrṣāsana.

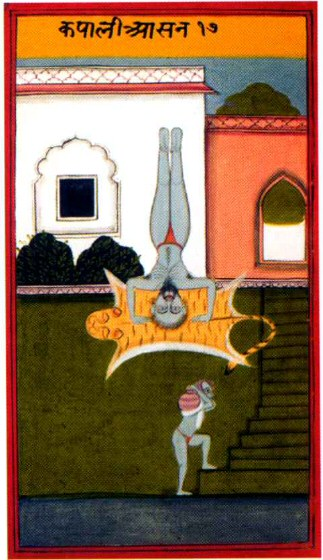
Headstand (labelled Kapālī Āsana) in Joga Pradīpikā, 1830

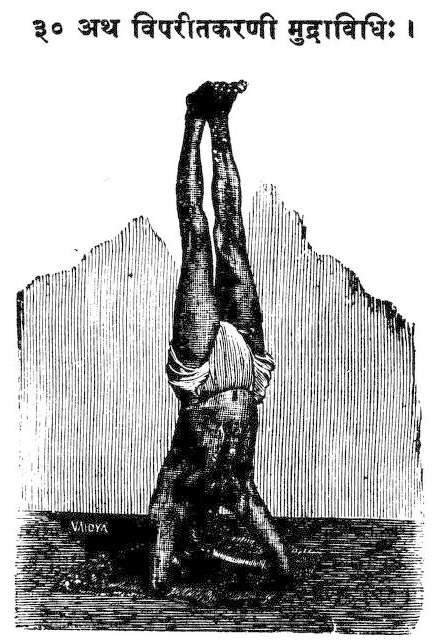
The mudra Viparita Karani using a headstand in Yogasopana Purvacatuska, 1905

== Description ==
In Supported Headstand (Salamba Shirshasana), the body is completely inverted and held upright supported by the forearms and the crown of the head. In Light on Yoga, B. K. S. Iyengar uses a forearm support, with the fingers interlocked around the head, for the basic posture Shirshasana I and its variations; he demonstrates a Western-style tripod headstand, the palms of the hands on the ground with raised elbows, for Shirshasana II and III; and other supports for further variants. Iyengar names and illustrates ten variants in all, as well as several preparatory and transitional poses.

The yoga headstand is nicknamed "king" of all the asanas. A variety of other asanas can be used to build the required upper body strength and balance.

Shirshasana, alongside Sarvangasana and Padmasana, is one of the asanas most often reported as the cause of an injury.

== Variations ==
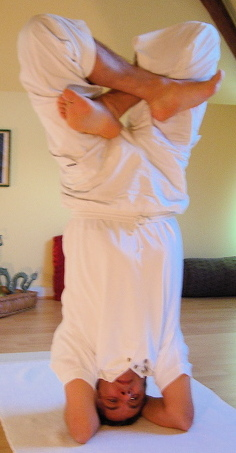
Urdhva Padmasana in Shirshasana

Shirshasana permits many variations, including:

Transliteration	English	Image
Salamba Shirshasana 2	Headstand 2 (palms down, shoulder width)	
Salamba Shirshasana 3	Headstand 3 (palms down, in front of face)	
Baddha Hasta Shirshasana	Bound Hands Headstand	
Baddha Konasana Shirshasana	Bound Angle Pose in Headstand	
Dvi Pada Viparita Dandasana	Headstand Backbend	
Eka Pada Shirshasana (Note: This name is used in Light on Yoga for two unrelated asanas, namely this variant of headstand, and for a one-leg-behind-neck sitting pose, an advanced preparatory pose for Dvi Pada Sirsasana with both legs behind the neck.)	Single Leg Headstand	
Mukta Hasta Shirshasana	Free Hands Headstand	
Parivrttaikapada Shirshasana	Single Leg Revolved Headstand	
Parshva Shirshasana	Side Headstand	
Parshvaikapada Shirshasana	Single Leg Headstand	
Upavistha Konasana Shirshasana	Seated Angle Pose in Headstand	
Urdhva Padmasana in Shirshasana	Upward Lotus in Headstand	

Mandalasana, or Circle Pose, is not a single variation but a sequence of movements in Shirshasana in which the legs move in a full circle around the body from one of these headstand variations to the next.

== See also ==
- List of asanas

== Sources ==
- Bühnemann, Gudrun (2007). Eighty-Four Asanas in Yoga: A Survey of Traditions. New Delhi: D. K. Printworld. ISBN 978-81-246-0417-5.
- Iyengar, B. K. S. (1991) [1966]. Light on Yoga. London: Thorsons. ISBN 978-0-00-714516-4. OCLC 51315708.
- Iyengar, Geeta (1 June 1998). Yoga: A Gem for Women. Allied Publishers. ISBN 978-81-7023-715-0.
- Mallinson, James; Singleton, Mark (2017). Roots of Yoga. Penguin Books. p. 104. ISBN 978-0-241-25304-5. OCLC 928480104.
- Norberg, Ulrica; Lundberg, Andreas (8 April 2008). Hatha Yoga: The Body's Path to Balance, Focus, and Strength. Skyhorse Publishing. ISBN 978-1-60239-218-2.
- Hoare, Sophy (1977). Yoga. Macdonald Educational. ISBN 978-0-356-06012-5.
- Ramdev, Swami (1 March 2006). Yoga: Its Philosophy & Practice. Diamond Pocket Books. ISBN 978-81-89235-15-4.
- Sjoman, Norman E. (1999) [1996]. The Yoga Tradition of the Mysore Palace (2nd ed.). Abhinav Publications. ISBN 81-7017-389-2.
