= Matsyendrasana =

Seated twisting posture in hatha yoga

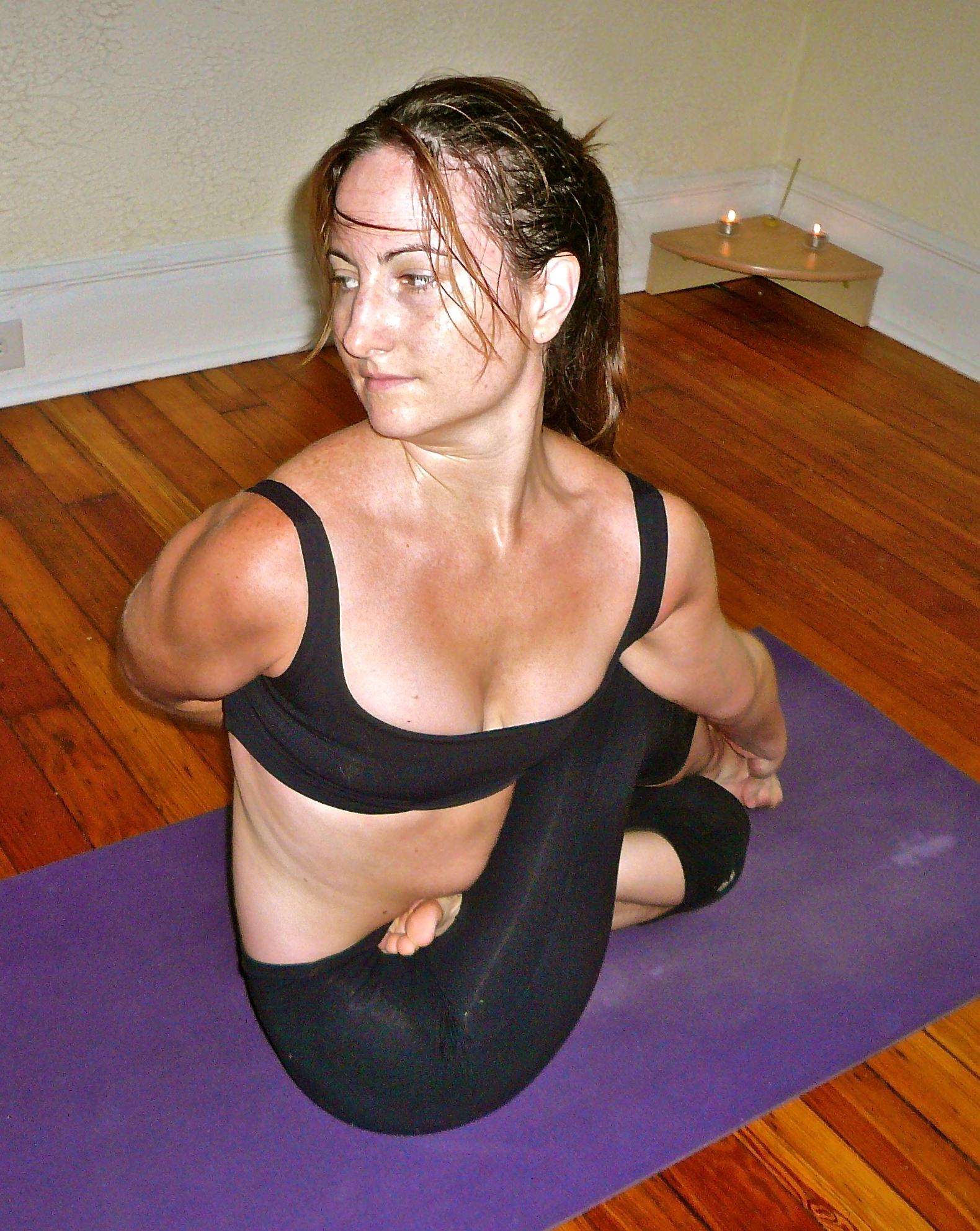
Paripurna Matsyendrasana

Matsyendrasana (Sanskrit: मत्स्येन्द्रासन; IAST: Matsyendrāsana), Matsyendra's Pose or Lord of the Fishes Pose is a seated twisting asana in hatha yoga and modern yoga as exercise. The full form is the difficult Paripurna Matsyendrasana. A common and easier variant is Ardha Matsyendrasana. The asana has many variations, and in its half form is one of the twelve basic asanas in many systems of hatha yoga.

== Etymology and origins ==
Historic halftone engraving of the pose from the cover of Yoga Sopana, 1905, the first modern illustrated book on yoga

The name comes from the Sanskrit words परिपूर्ण Paripurna, perfected; मत्स्येन्द् Matsyendra, one of the founders of hatha yoga, whose name in turn means "lord of the fishes"; and आसन asana, posture or seat; अर्ध ardha means half.

The asana is medieval, described in the 15th century Haṭha Yoga Pradīpikā 1.26-7, which states that it destroys many diseases, and the 17th century Gheraṇḍa Saṃhitā 2.22-23.

Yogi Ghamande chose the asana for the cover of his historic 1905 book Yogasopana Purvachatushka; he represented the pose using a halftone plate, giving for the first time a realistic impression of the body of the yogi.

== Description ==
One foot is placed flat on the floor outside the opposite leg, and the torso twists towards the top leg. The bottom leg may be bent with the foot outside the opposite hip or extended with toes vertically. The arms help lever the torso into the twist, and may be bound in a variety of configurations by clutching either a foot or the opposite hand.

== Variations ==
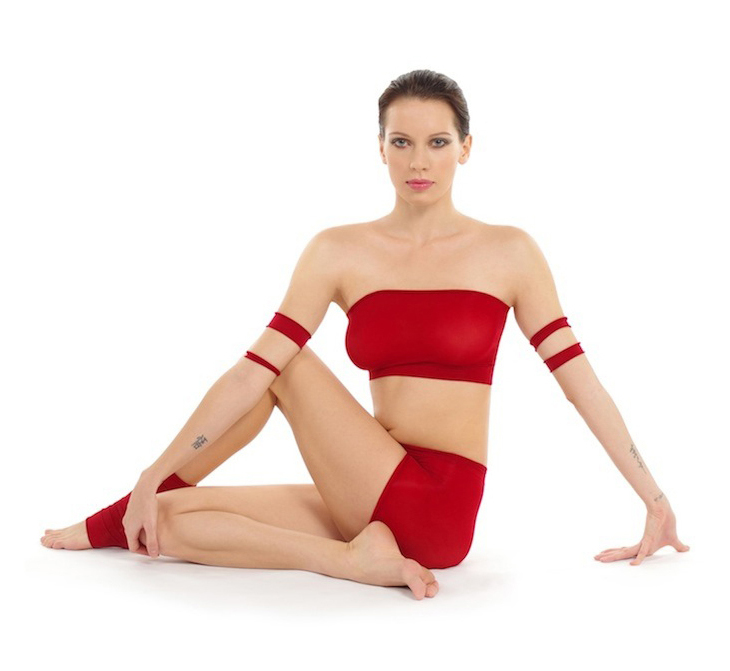
Ardha Matsyendrasana I, a commonly practised half form of the pose

For Ardha Matsyendrasana I, sit with one leg bent on the ground, the foot tucked in close to the body, and cross the other leg over across the body, the knee raised and bent, and the foot on the ground by the outside of the other leg. Twist the body and grasp the raised knee. Some practitioners will be comfortable bringing the arm over to press against the raised knee, without leaning back; some can clasp the hands behind the back.

Ardha Matsyendrasana II has one leg straight out on the ground, the other bent as for Padmasana; the hand on the bent leg side grasps the outside of the outstretched boot, and the other hand reaches round the back to grasp the calf of the bent leg.

Ardha Matsyendrasana III is entered from Ardha Matsyendrasana I. The bottom leg moves into Padmasana, and the arms bind by grasping both feet.

For the reclining variant, Supta Matsyendrasana, starting from a supine position, the arms are stretched out at shoulder level, one knee is bent, and it and the hips are rotated across to the opposite side.

== See also ==
- Bharadvajasana, a seated twist with both knees on the floor
- Jathara Parivartanasana, a reclining twist, revolving both legs together
- Marichyasana, a seated twist with one leg straight

== Sources ==
- Ghamande, Narayana (1905). Yogasopana purvacatusca (1st ed.). Bombay: Janardan Mahadev Gurjar, Niranayasagar Press.
- —— (1951). Yogasopana purvacatusca (3rd ed.). Bombay: Tukarama Book Depot.
- Iyengar, B. K. S. (1979) [1966]. Light on Yoga: Yoga Dipika. Thorsons. ISBN 978-1855381667.
- Singleton, Mark (2010). Yoga Body: the Origins of Modern Posture Practice. Oxford University Press. ISBN 978-0-19-539534-1. OCLC 318191988.
