= Salabhasana =

Prone back-bending posture in modern yoga

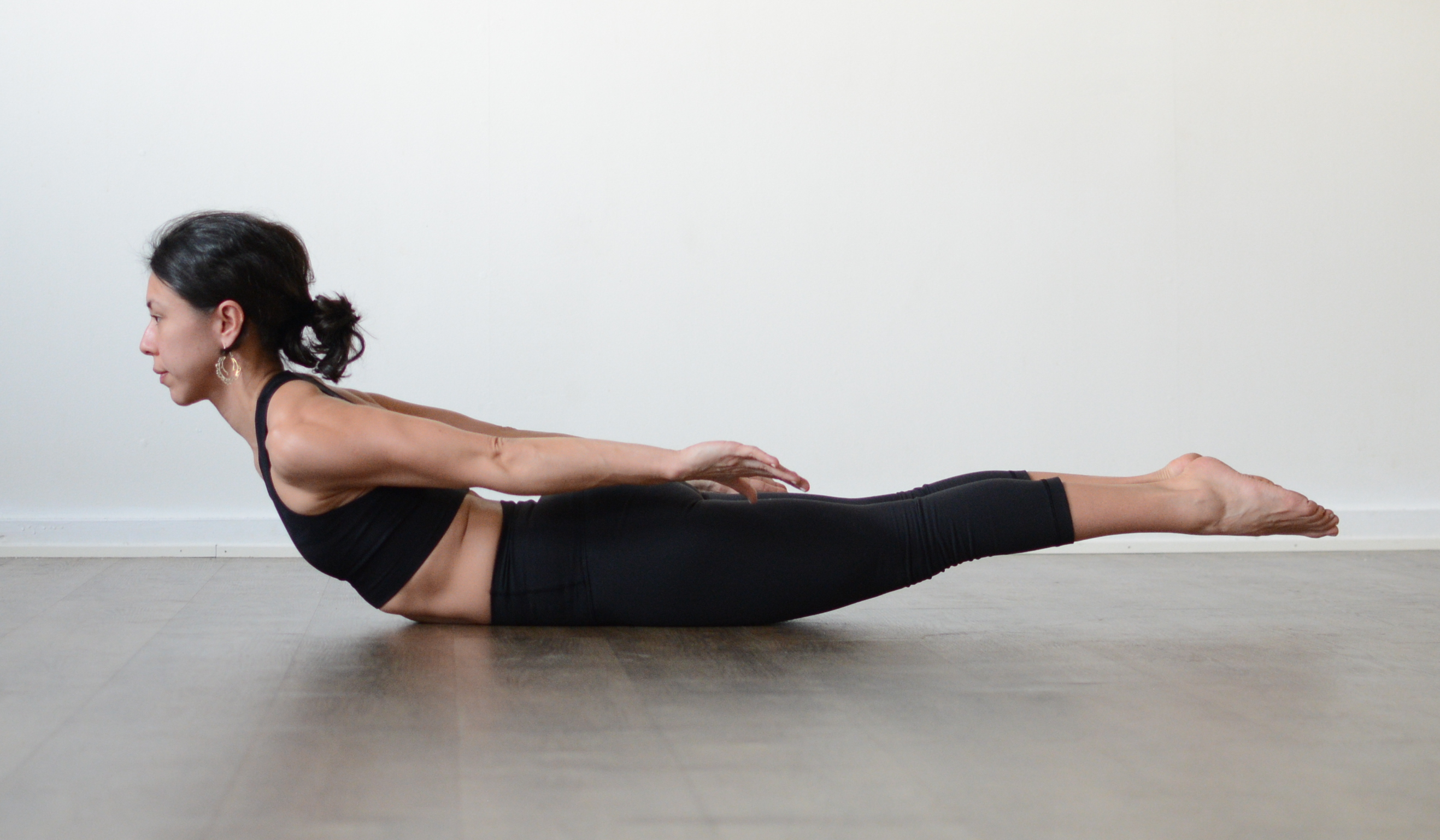
Salabhasana

Salabhasana or Purna Salabhasana (Sanskrit: शलभासन; IAST: Śalabhāsana), Locust pose, or Grasshopper pose is a prone back-bending asana in modern yoga as exercise.

== Etymology and origins ==
The asana's name comes from the Sanskrit शलभ shalabh which means "grasshopper" or "locust".

The pose is not found in the medieval hatha yoga texts. It is included in Yoga Ghamande's 1905 Yogasopana Purvacatuska, the first yoga manual with printed illustrations, uniquely as halftone plates. It is described independently in Swami Vishnudevananda's 1960 Complete Illustrated Book of Yoga in the Sivananda Yoga tradition, and by B. K. S. Iyengar in his 1966 Light on Yoga, implying that it may have older origins. A similar pose was found in Western harmonial gymnastics in The Bagot Stack Stretch-and-Swing System, 1931, though Mary Bagot Stack had visited India.

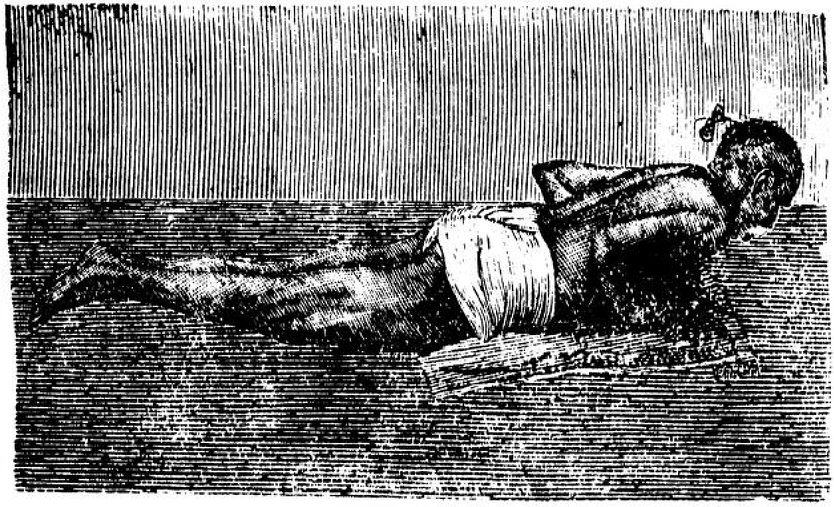
Salabhasana in Yogasopana Purvacatuska, 1905

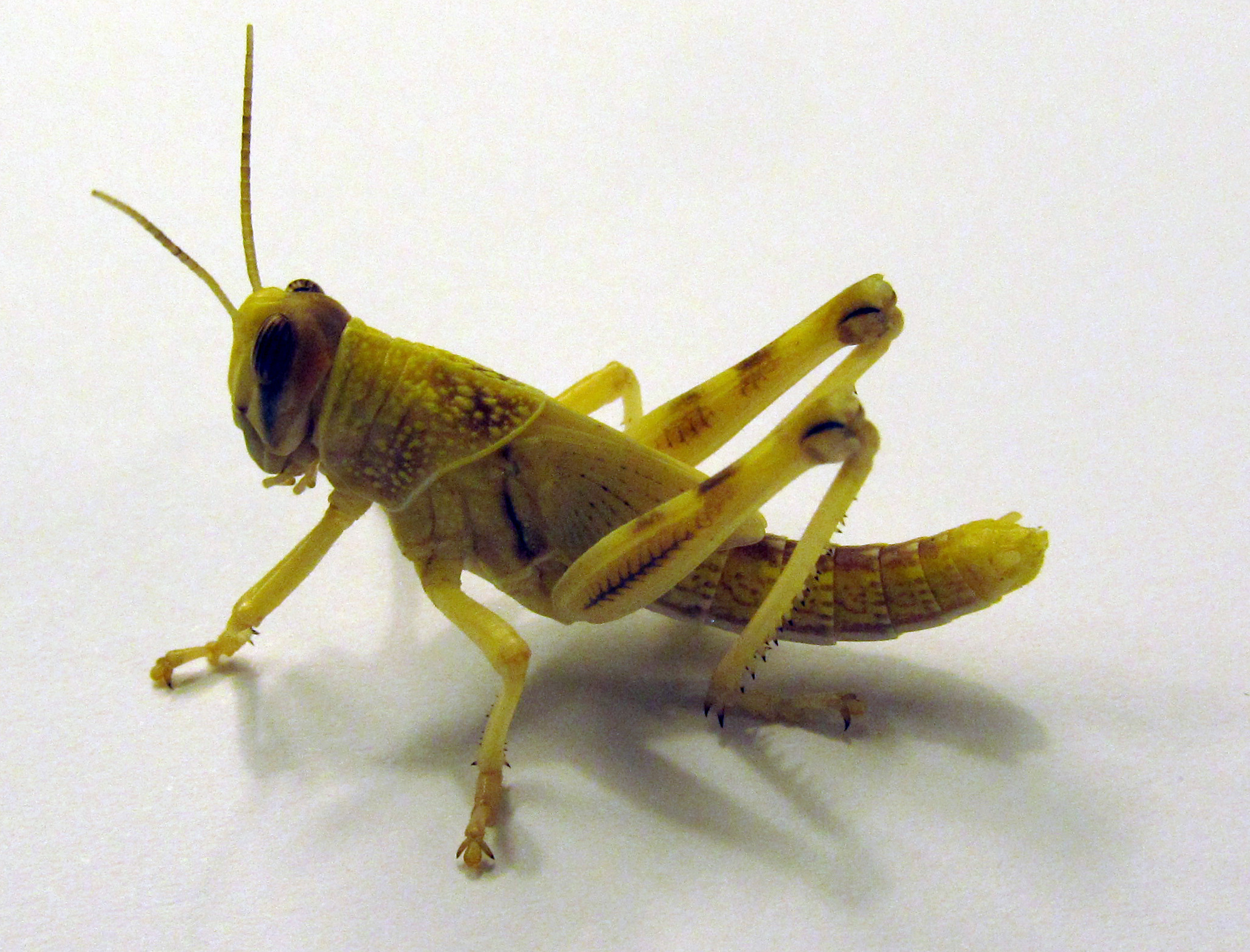
A locust, Schistocerca gregaria, both head and 'tail' up

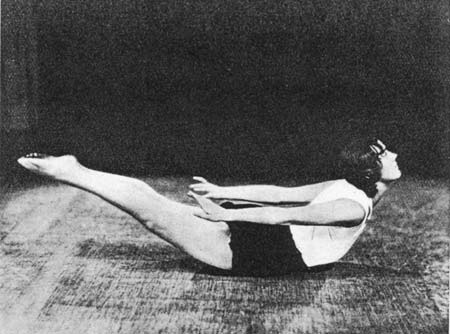
Mary Bagot Stack in "Seal" posture, 1931

== Description ==
Salabhasana is entered from a prone position. The legs are stretched out straight and lifted; the arms are stretched straight back, palms down, and lifted; the head is lifted and the gaze is directed straight ahead. It is a back bend, or spine stretch, utilizing the strength of the upper and middle back to lift the weight of the legs as high as possible from a starting position while face down on the floor. It improves flexibility and coordination, exercises the back muscles, and increases strength and stamina.

== Variations ==
Ardha Salabhasana (Half locust pose) raises one leg and the opposite arm at a time; the other arm may rest on the floor or be folded over the back.

In Bikram Yoga, Salabhasana, following another reclining backbend, Bhujangasana or Cobra Pose, is performed in stages. First, the arms are placed under the body pointing straight towards the feet, palms downwards, and the chin is rested on the floor. Then the left and right legs are lifted alternately. Finally, both legs are lifted together.

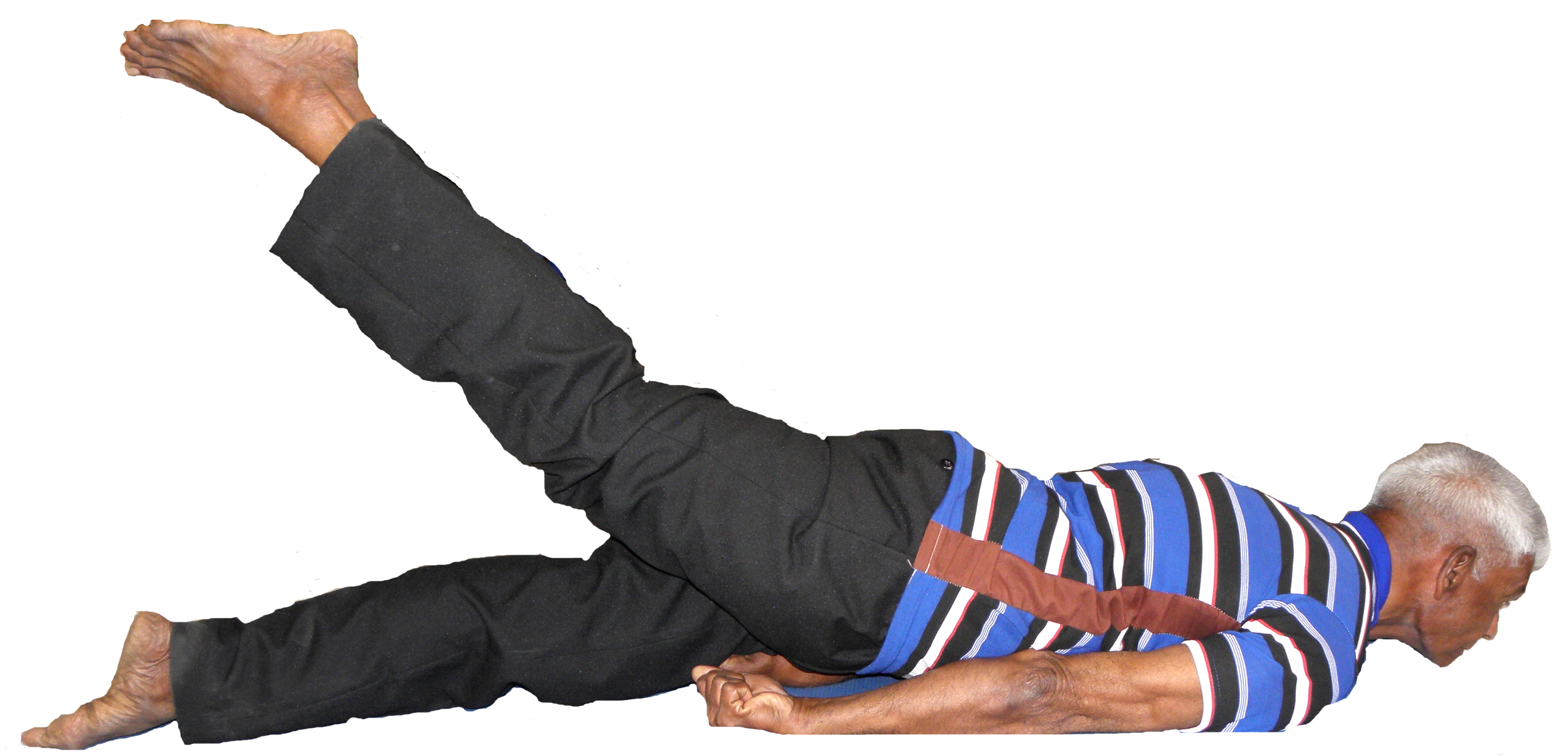
Half locust pose, moving one leg only

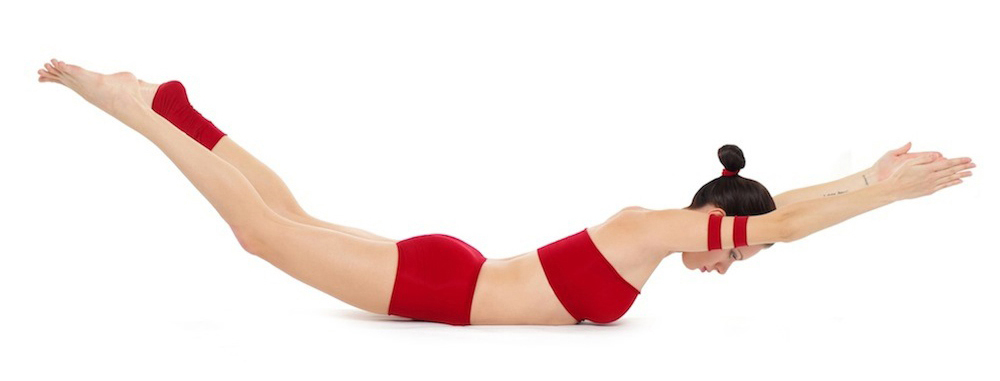
Variant arm position

In Sivananda yoga, the hands are placed beneath the thighs, and the chin and chest remain on the floor.

Sivananda half locust pose (Ardha Salabhasana)

Sivananda full locust pose
