= Sarvangasana =

Inverted posture in yoga as exercise

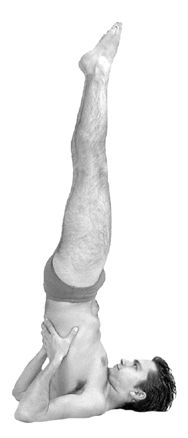
Sarvangasana

Sarvangasana (Sanskrit: सर्वाङ्गासन, romanized: sarvāṅgāsana), Shoulder stand, or more fully Salamba Sarvangasana (Supported Shoulder stand), is an inverted asana in modern yoga as exercise; similar poses were used in medieval hatha yoga as a mudra.

Many named variations exist, including with legs in lotus position and Supta Konasana with legs wide apart, toes on the ground.

Sarvāṅgāsana has been nicknamed the "queen" or "mother" of all the asanas.

== Etymology and origins ==
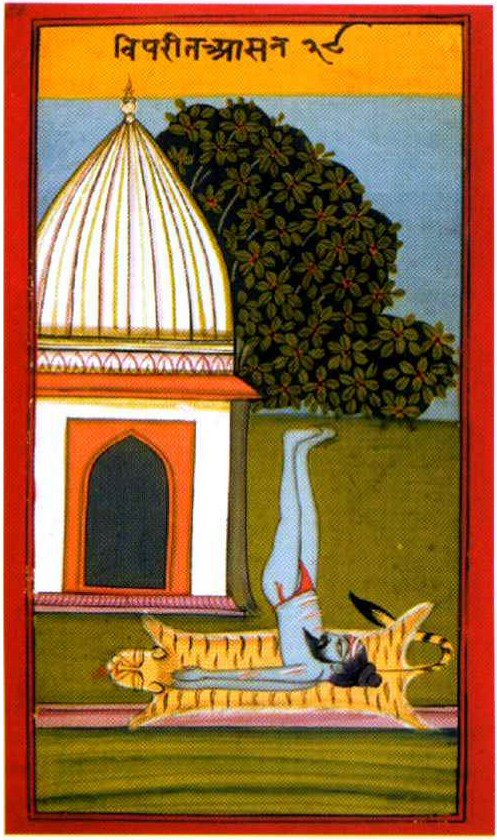
The mudra Viparita Karani uses a variety of inverted poses, sometimes similar to the modern Sarvangasana, to trap and retain prana, life force, which would otherwise drip from the head and be lost. Illustrated manuscript of the Joga Pradipika, 1830.

The name comes from the Sanskrit सालम्ब Salamba, "supported", सर्वाङ्ग Sarvāṅga, "all limbs", i.e. "the whole body", and आसन Āsana, "posture"," position", or "seat".

The name Sarvangasana is modern, but similar inverted poses were in use in medieval hatha yoga as a mudra, Viparita Karani, which is documented in the 14th century Śiva Saṃhitā 4.45-47, the 15th century Haṭha Yoga Pradīpikā 3.78-81, the 17th century Gheraṇḍa Saṃhitā 3.33-35, and other early texts such as the Dattātreyayogaśāstra. The purpose of Viparita Karani had been to reverse the downflow and subsequent loss of life force, using gravity; by the 17th century this had become an asana, variously named narakasana, kapalasana, and viparitakaranasana, part of the long process of growth of the practice of asanas.

== Description ==
Shoulderstand is entered from a supine position with the knees bent. The shoulders may be supported on folded blankets, and the upper arms may be held in with a belt just above the elbows. Beginners may lift with bent legs, advanced users with straight legs. The back is supported by the hands: once up, the hands reach lower down the trunk towards the head, and the trunk is lifted further; the legs may then be straightened to a vertical position.

== Variations ==
The posture may be entered from Halasana (plough), moving to a cycle of poses such as Karnapidasana (ear pressing pose) with the knees bent close to the head and grasped by the arms; or to Parsva Halasana (sideways plough) with the body vertical, the trunk twisted to one side, and legs out straight with the feet touching the ground (to that side); to Supta Konasana, with the legs spread as wide as possible, the fingertips grasping the big toes; or Parsva Sarvangasana, an advanced pose, with both legs leaning to one side; and Urdhva Padmasana in Sarvangasana, with the legs in lotus position.

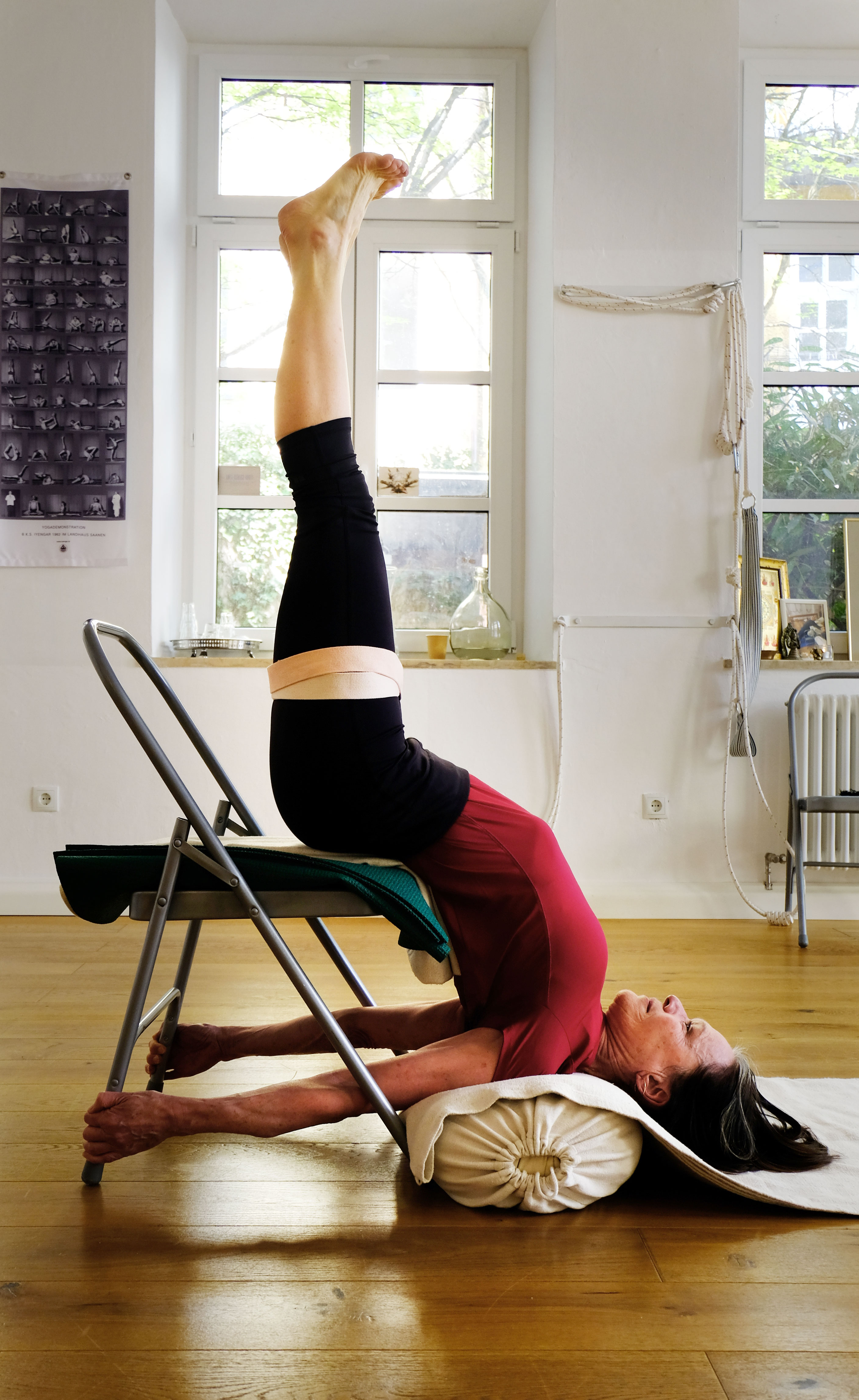
Iyengar Yoga teaches the pose using props to ensure correct alignment.

Salamba Sarvangasana may be performed on a strong and stable chair, with the legs resting on the chair back, the body supported by a folded blanket on the chair's seat, and the shoulders and neck supported on a bolster on the ground. The hands may grasp the back legs of the chair to open the chest. The pose is entered by sitting astride the chair facing the back, lifting the legs on to the back, holding the chair and leaning back, then sliding down until the head reaches the ground. The pose is exited by bending the legs and sliding down carefully.

Niralamba Sarvangasana is Unsupported Shoulderstand, with the arms off the ground.

== Claimed benefits ==
Twentieth century advocates of some schools of yoga, such as B. K. S. Iyengar, made claims for the effects of yoga on specific organs, without adducing any evidence. Iyengar devoted a whole page of Light on Yoga to the beneficial effects of Sarvangasana, claiming that the pose is "one of the greatest boons conferred on humanity by our ancient sages", calling it "the Mother of asanas" and "a panacea for most common ailments." He asserted that the pose had a direct effect on the thyroid and parathyroid glands, explaining that the chin lock increased their blood supply. He stated that the inversion increased venous blood flow to the heart, increasing the blood supply to the neck and chest, and hence relieving "breathlessness, palpitation, asthma, bronchitis and throat ailments." He stated that it soothed the nerves and abolished headaches and with continued practice also the common cold. The soothing of the nerves in turn, he wrote, relieved hypertension, irritation, shortness of temper, nervous breakdown, and insomnia. The inversion assisted, he wrote, with bowel movements. It was useful, Iyengar claimed, for urinary disorders, menstrual problems, piles, hernia, epilepsy, low vitality, and anaemia.

== Safety ==
Sarvangasana, alongside Sirsasana and Padmasana, is one of the asanas most often reported as the cause of an injury. Iyengar advised against the pose for people with high blood pressure, for whom he recommended halasana instead, as in his view it brought similar benefits.

== See also ==
- List of asanas

== Sources ==
- Bernard, Theos (2007) [1944]. Hatha Yoga: The Report of a Personal Experience. Edinburgh: Harmony. ISBN 978-0-9552412-2-2. OCLC 230987898.
- Iyengar, B. K. S. (1979) [1966]. Light on Yoga: Yoga Dipika. Unwin Paperbacks. ISBN 978-1-85538-166-7.
- Jain, Andrea (2015). Selling Yoga: from Counterculture to Pop culture. Oxford University Press. ISBN 978-0-19-939024-3. OCLC 878953765.
- Mehta, Silva; Mehta, Mira; Mehta, Shyam (1990). Yoga: The Iyengar Way. Dorling Kindersley.
- Mallinson, James; Singleton, Mark (2017). Roots of Yoga. Penguin Books. ISBN 978-0-241-25304-5. OCLC 928480104.
- Newcombe, Suzanne (2019). Yoga in Britain: Stretching Spirituality and Educating Yogis. Bristol, England: Equinox Publishing. ISBN 978-1-78179-661-0.
