= Yoga's global dispersal =

Spread of yoga outside India

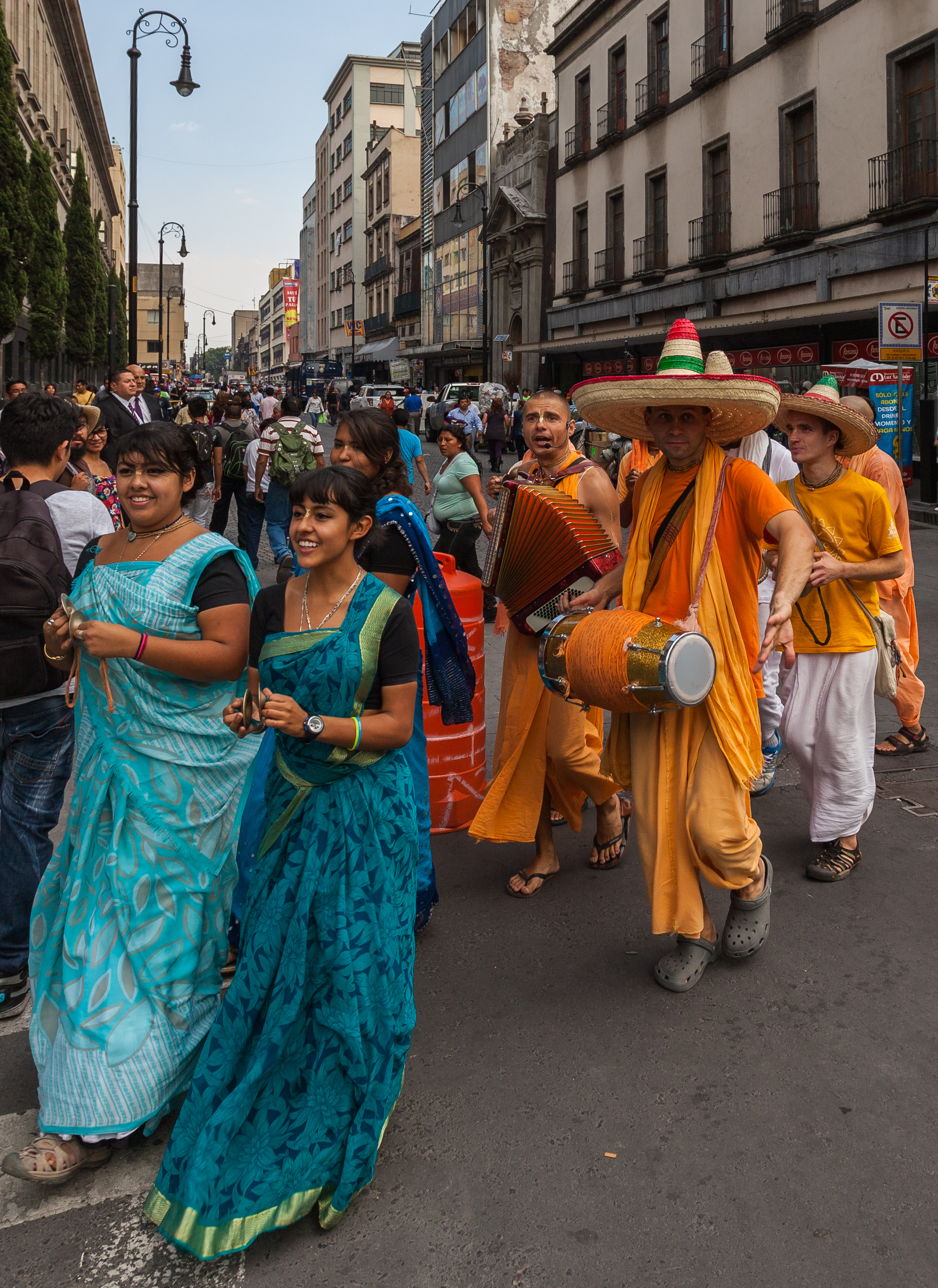
Hare Krishna musicians in Mexico City: ISKCON arrived in Mexico in 1971.

Yoga dispersal timeline
7th c.	Yoga to Southeast Asian islands
8th c.	Yoga texts translated to Tibetan
1893	Vivekananda brings yoga to US
1916	Ramacharaka translated to Japanese
1929	Yogananda visits Mexico
1955	Yoga centre founded in Seoul, S. Korea
1971	Prabhupada brings ISKCON to Mexico

Yoga's global dispersal is the transmission of forms of yoga from the Indian subcontinent to the rest of the world. The process began by the 7th century CE with the arrival of Hinduism in the islands of Southeast Asia (modern Indonesia). Most of the yoga there was meditative but temple statues in Central Java attest to the presence of yoga postures.

From the 8th to the 12th centuries, Tibetan Buddhists translated many yoga texts from Sanskrit. Tibetan yoga is tantric, with meditations, visualisations, and sequences of movements.

Vivekananda's 1893 visit to the US started the development of transnational anglophone yoga. This became mainly postural when Krishnamacharya in the 1930s combined haṭha yoga, Indian wrestling exercises, and modern Western gymnastics. This was spread to the Western world by his pupils Pattabhi Jois, B.K.S. Iyengar, and others. Japan and Korea too acquired yoga in the 20th century, while Latin America took it on after Yogananda's visit to Mexico in 1929.

== Context ==
Yoga is a group of practices that arose in the Indian subcontinent, such as asceticism, meditation, and visualisation, as described in ancient Sanskrit documents including Patañjali's Yoga Sūtras.

== Medieval ==
=== Islands of Southeast Asia ===
Yoga reached the islands of Southeast Asia by the 7th century CE and continued its spread there until at least 1500 CE. Hinduism survives in Bali but has largely been replaced by Islam elsewhere in the region. Yoga using asanas was a minority practice in Bali and in Java, but seated meditation poses are attested in relief statues at the 9th century Hindu temple complex of Prambanan, while the bodhisattva Maitreya is depicted in a one-legged standing pose at the 9th century Buddhist temple of Borobudur, also in Central Java. Texts in Old Javanese attest to multiple forms of yoga, including Pātañjali's eight-limbed aṣṭāṅgayoga and tantric Shaivism's six-limbed ṣaḍaṅgayoga, and combinations of the two. The Dharma Pātañjala expounds the Javanese version of Shaivite Siddhānta, along with detailed coverage of Pātañjala yoga, paraphrasing and explaining the Yoga Sutras.

The practice of sadyotkrānti is attested in both Old Javanese and Indian texts; it calls for forceful expulsion of the breath to bring about death, so as to ensure liberation. The practice survives in the religion of modern Bali, where the soul can be recalled during a funeral to improve the outcome. Old Javanese texts on sexual yoga have survived in Bali; they call for meditative sexual union, effectively identifying the partners with the deities Kāma and Rati. The ten sacred syllables, the daśakṣara, related to the three parts A, U, M of the sacred sound Om ॐ, feature prominently in modern Bali, along with the use of mantras.

In modern times, postural yoga has become popular in Indonesian cities, despite a 2009 fatwa against its practice by Indonesian Muslims. Practitioners are however essentially unaware of Bali and Java's medieval traditions of yoga. Many yoga retreats are held in Bali, centred on the town of Ubud.

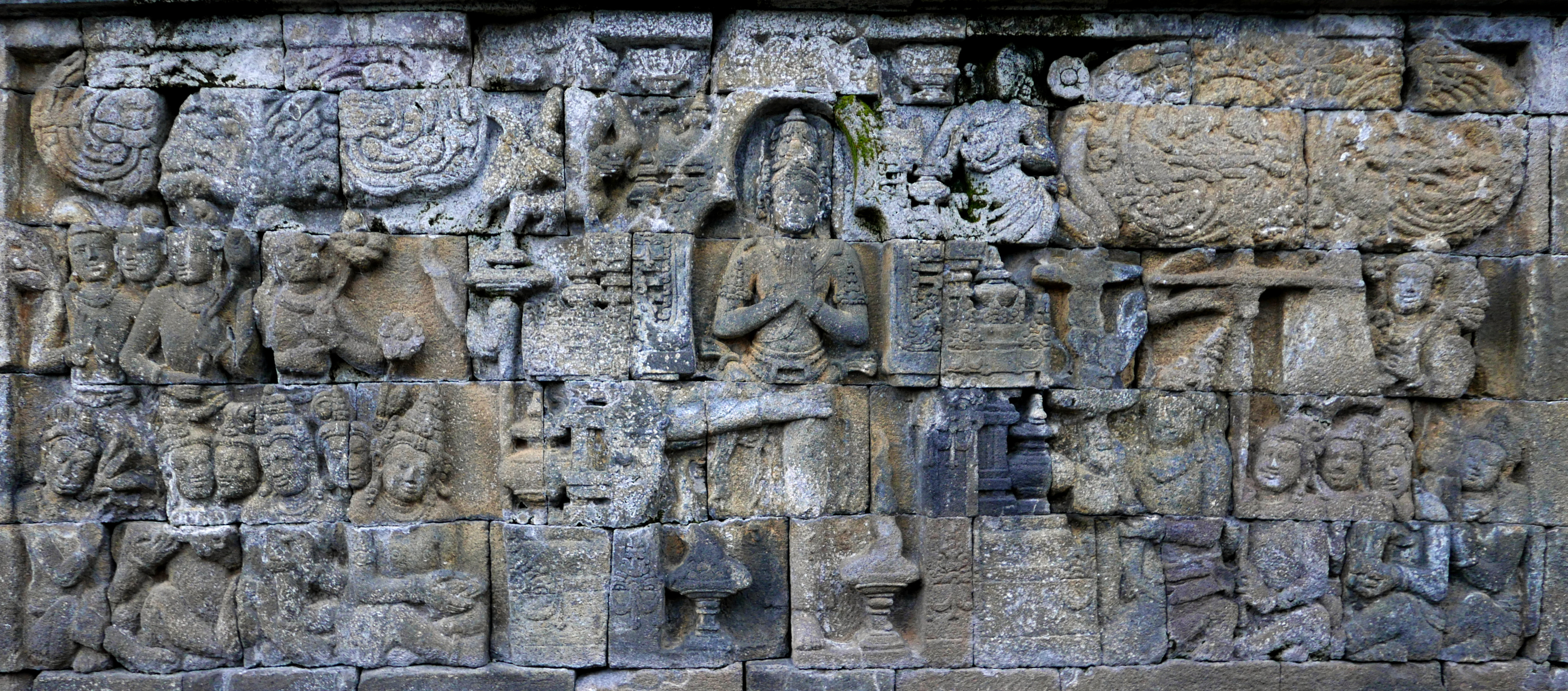
Bodhisattva Maitreya practising a one-legged standing pose as an austerity, Borobudur, 9th century

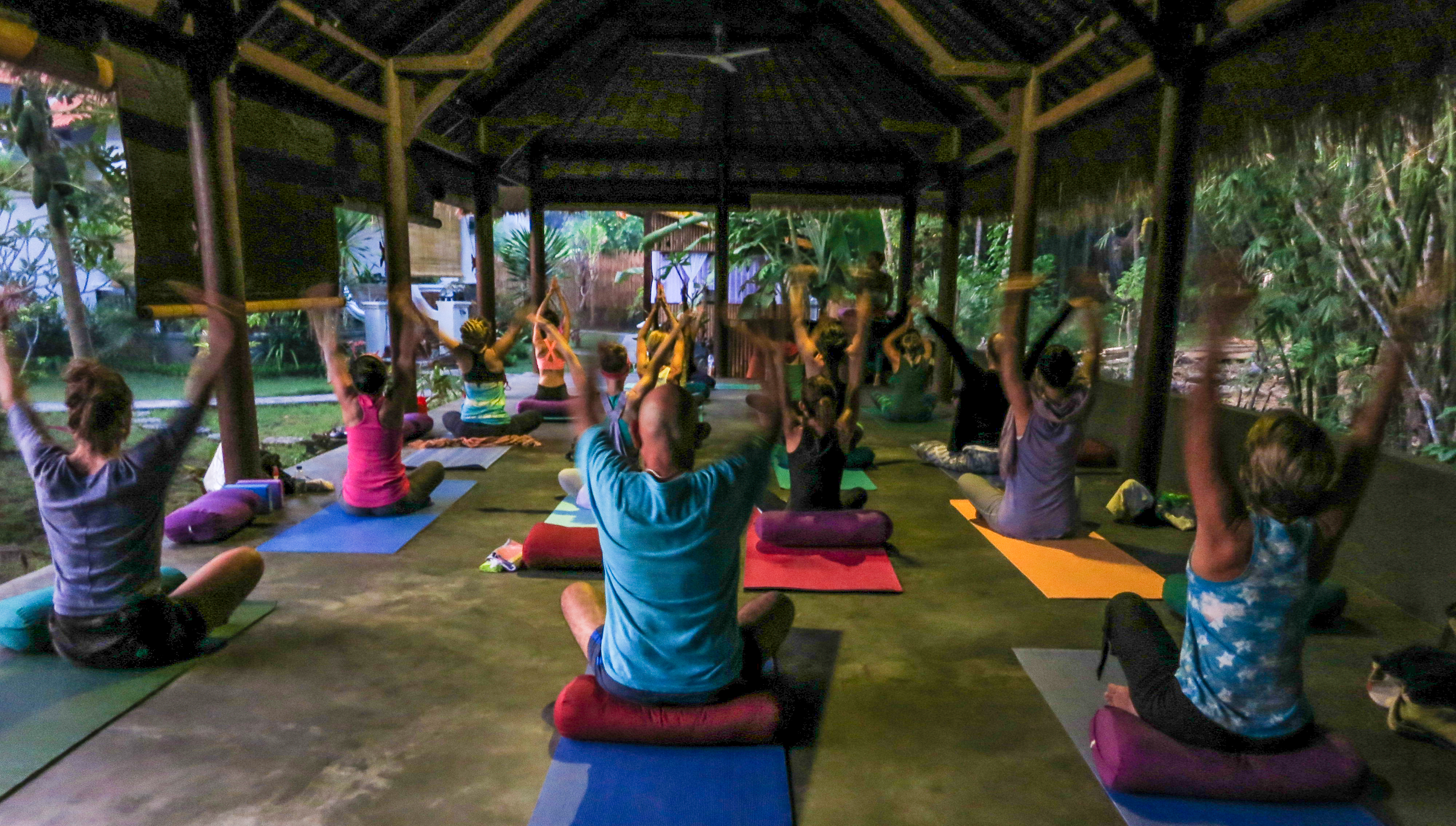
A modern postural yoga class in Bali

=== Tibet ===
The Sanskrit word 'yoga' was translated to the Tibetan naljor (rnal ’byor) in the 8th century, meaning a philosophy-based meditative practice. It was applied both to tantric systems and to Tibetan Buddhist yoga systems such as Kālacakra and Mahāmudrā. A mass of yoga texts was translated from the 8th until the 12th centuries, spurring the growth of Tibetan Buddhism. The six Kālacakra yogas are pranayama, pratyahara, dhyana, dharana, anusmŗti, and samadhi: all but anusmŗti ("recollection") share names with branches of Pātañjali's eight-limbed aṣṭāṅgayoga. The 11th century Tibetan yogi Milarepa practised tantric yoga, becoming enlightened through "inner heat".

From the 12th century, the 'New Order' classified tantras into four: Kriyātantra, with rituals using a shrine or image of a deity; Caryātantra, like Kriyātantra with practices like seed-syllable meditation; Yoga tantra, with visualisations of the practitioner as a deity; and Unsurpassed Yoga tantra (Anuttara-yoga-tantra), visualising oneself as a deity and meditating on one's empty nature at the same time.

Tibetan monks continue to practice inner heat yoga in the 21st century at Namdroling Monastery in Karnataka, India. The Sky Dharma (gnam chos) Book Two, Winds, Channels, and Inner Heat, covers 9 trul khor; these are sequences of movements accompanied by holding the breath, deity yoga, and visualisations of the subtle body. Some monks have returned to Tibet to teach.

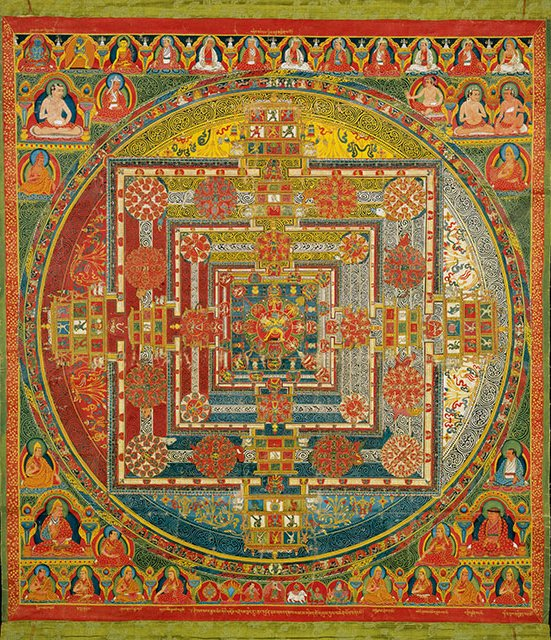
A 16th century Kālacakra mandala

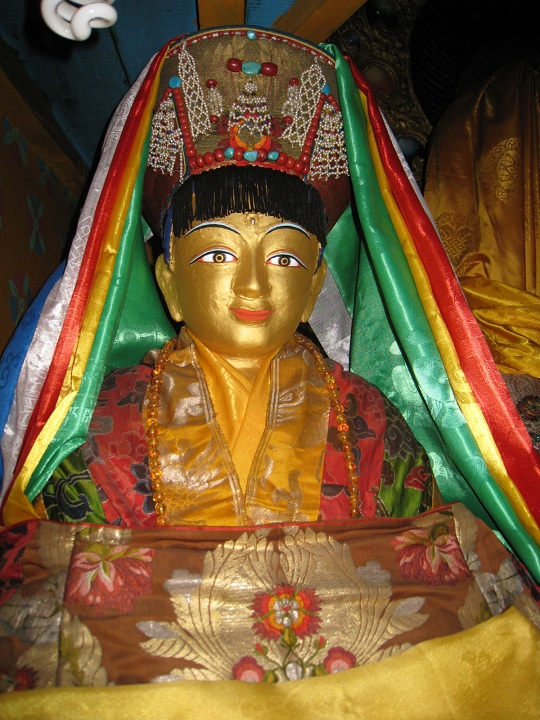
Statue of the 11th century Tibetan yogi Milarepa

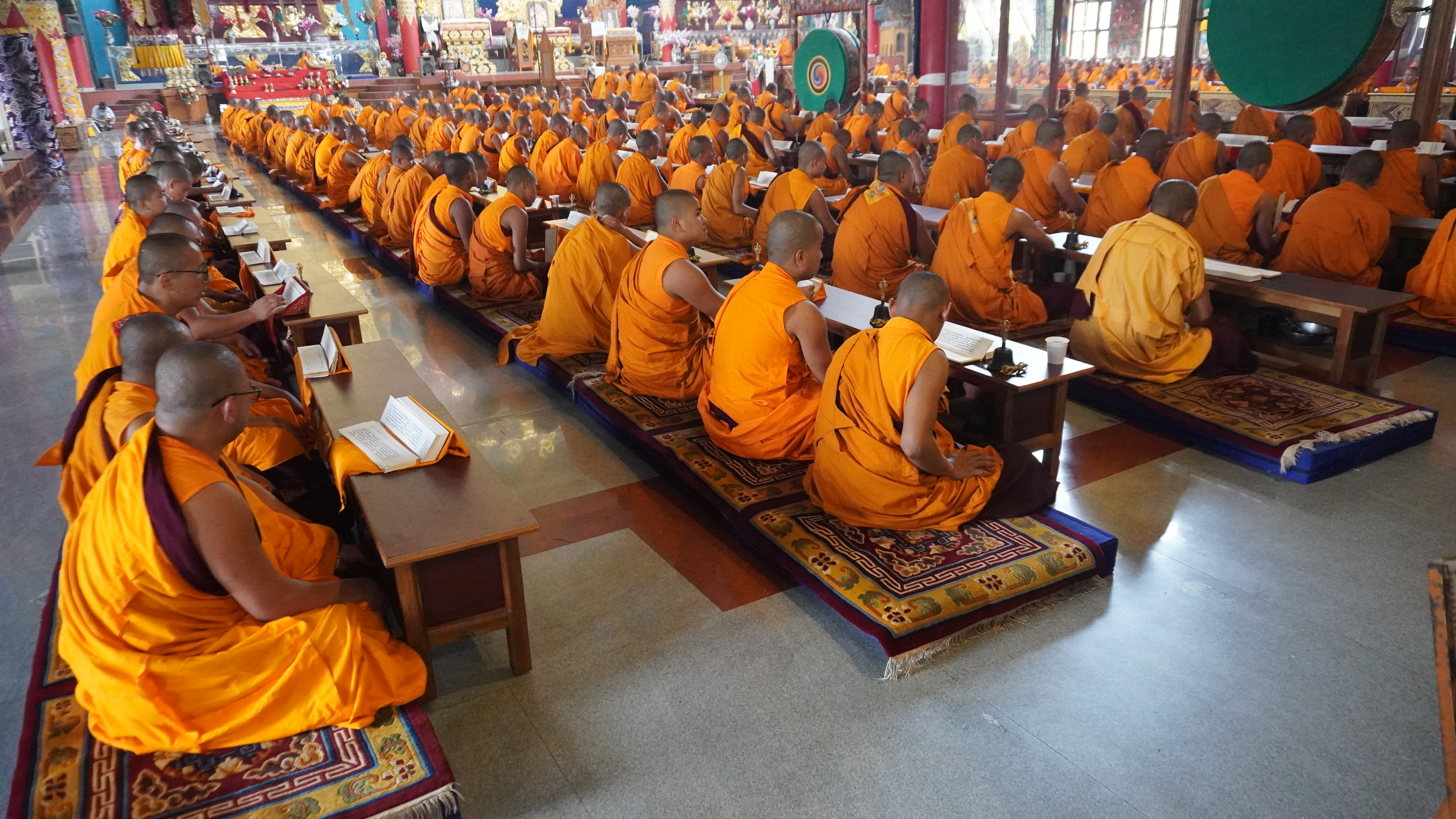
Monks at Namdroling Monastery

== Modern ==
=== English-speaking countries outside India ===
Yoga came to the Anglophone world beyond India partly because many yoga teachers in India spoke English under the British Raj. Yoga was introduced to the Western world by the spiritual leader Vivekananda's 1893 visit to the World Parliament of Religions in Chicago, and his 1896 book Raja Yoga. However, he rejected Haṭha yoga and its "entirely" physical practices such as asanas as difficult and ineffective for spiritual growth, out of a widely shared distaste for India's wandering yogins. Yoga asanas were brought to America by the yoga teacher Yogendra. He founded a branch of The Yoga Institute in New York state in 1919, starting to make Haṭha yoga acceptable, seeking scientific evidence for its health benefits, and writing books such as his 1928 Yoga Asanas Simplified and his 1931 Yoga Personal Hygiene. The flowing sequences of salute to the sun, Surya Namaskar, now accepted as yoga and containing popular asanas such as Uttanasana and upward and downward dog poses, were popularized by the Rajah of Aundh, Bhawanrao Shrinivasrao Pant Pratinidhi, in the 1920s.

In 1924, the yoga teacher Kuvalayananda founded the Kaivalyadhama Health and Yoga Research Center in Maharashtra, combining asanas with gymnastics, and like Yogendra seeking a scientific and medical basis for yogic practices.

In 1925, Kuvalayananda's rival Paramahansa Yogananda, having moved from India to America, set up the Self-Realization Fellowship in Los Angeles, and taught yoga, including asanas, breathing, chanting and meditation, to "tens of thousands of Americans". In 1923, Yogananda's younger brother, Bishnu Charan Ghosh, founded the Ghosh College of Yoga and Physical Culture in Calcutta.

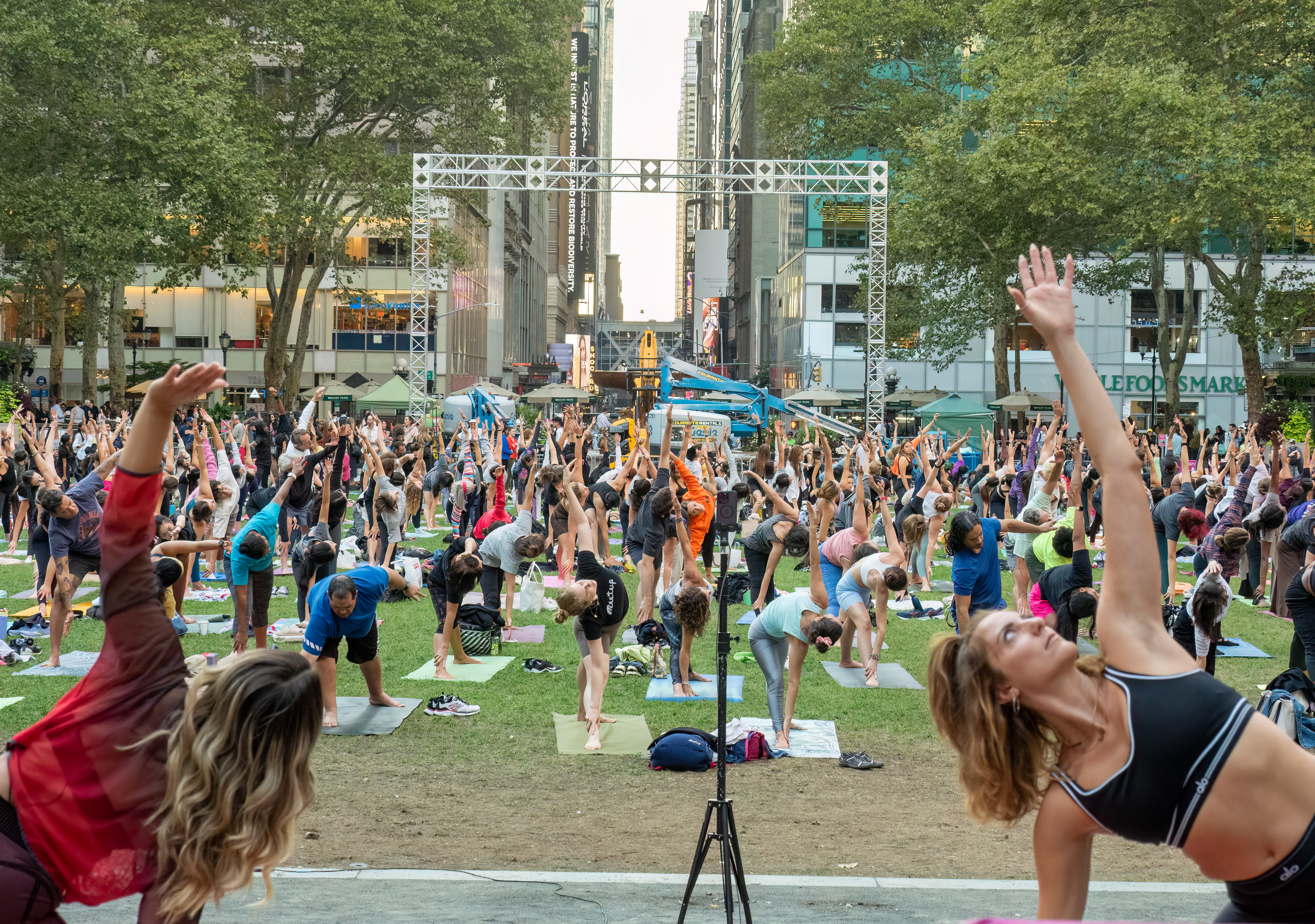
Public yoga as exercise in Bryant Park, New York, 2023

Tirumalai Krishnamacharya (1888–1989), "the father of modern yoga", claimed to have spent seven years with one of the few masters of Haṭha yoga then living, Ramamohana Brahmachari, at Lake Manasarovar in Tibet, from 1912 to 1918. He studied under Kuvalayananda in the 1930s, and then in his yogashala in the Jaganmohan Palace in Mysore created "a marriage of Haṭha yoga, [Indian] wrestling exercises, and modern Western gymnastic movement, and unlike anything seen before in the yoga tradition." The Maharajah of Mysore Krishna Raja Wadiyar IV was a leading advocate of physical culture in India, and a neighbouring hall of his palace was used to teach Surya Namaskar classes, then considered to be gymnastic exercises. Krishnamacharya adapted these sequences of exercises into his flowing vinyasa style of yoga.

Krishnamacharya's pupils included some influential yoga teachers: the Russian Eugenie V. Peterson, known as Indra Devi (from 1937), who moved to Hollywood, taught yoga to celebrities, and wrote the bestselling book Forever Young, Forever Healthy; Pattabhi Jois (from 1927), who founded the flowing style Ashtanga Vinyasa Yoga whose Mysore style makes use of repetitions of Surya Namaskar, in 1948, which in turn led to styles of yoga in America such as Power Yoga; and B.K.S. Iyengar (from 1933), his brother-in-law, who founded Iyengar Yoga, with its first centre in Britain. Together they made yoga popular as exercise across the Western world.

=== Japan ===
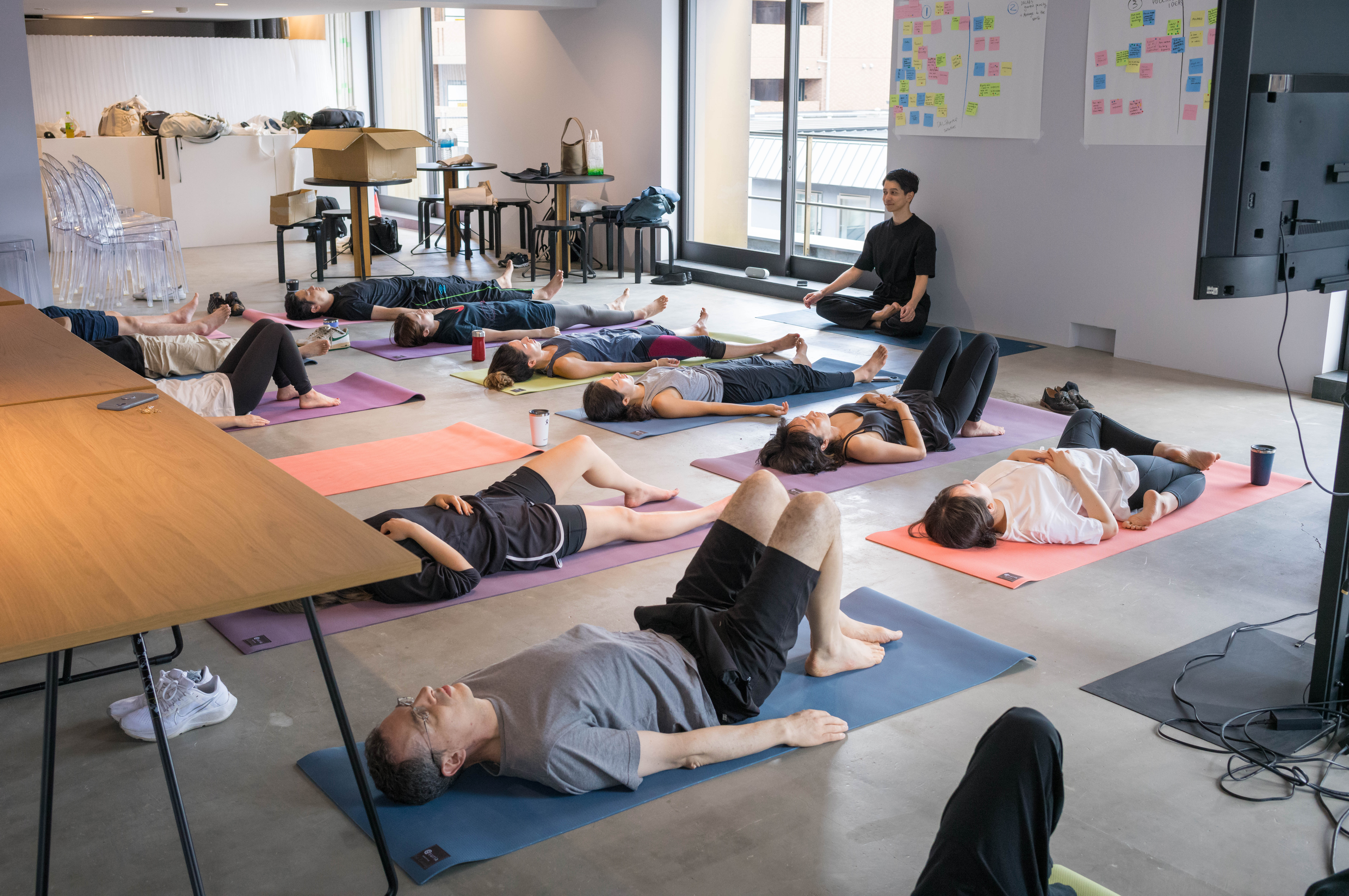
A yoga class in Kyoto

Japan has a tradition of meditation from the 6th century, when Buddhism was introduced to the country. Yoga was brought to Japan by the businessman Matsuda Reiyō, a pupil of Fujita Reisai (1868–1957) who advocated Tanden-style breathing techniques. Reiyō translated the writings of the American occultist and New Thought advocate Yogi Ramacharaka (from 1916), into Japanese. Among the spiritual practices influenced by New Thought was Tempu Nakamura's (1876–1968) Shinshin-tōitsu-dō ("way of mind-body unification", dubbed 'Japanese yoga'); Nakamura claimed he had studied yoga in India. After the Second World War, Oki Masahiro (1921–1985) led people to live communally with yoga and meditation. The cult Aum Shinrikyō grew from Asahara Shoko's Tokyo yoga school which had been founded in 1984. The cult developed a syncretistic doctrine based on both Hinduism and esoteric Buddhism; in 1995, it launched a terrorist attack on the Tokyo subway. Since then, yoga in Japan has become less political under the influence of global capitalism, and is practised for personal and psychological goals.

=== Latin America ===
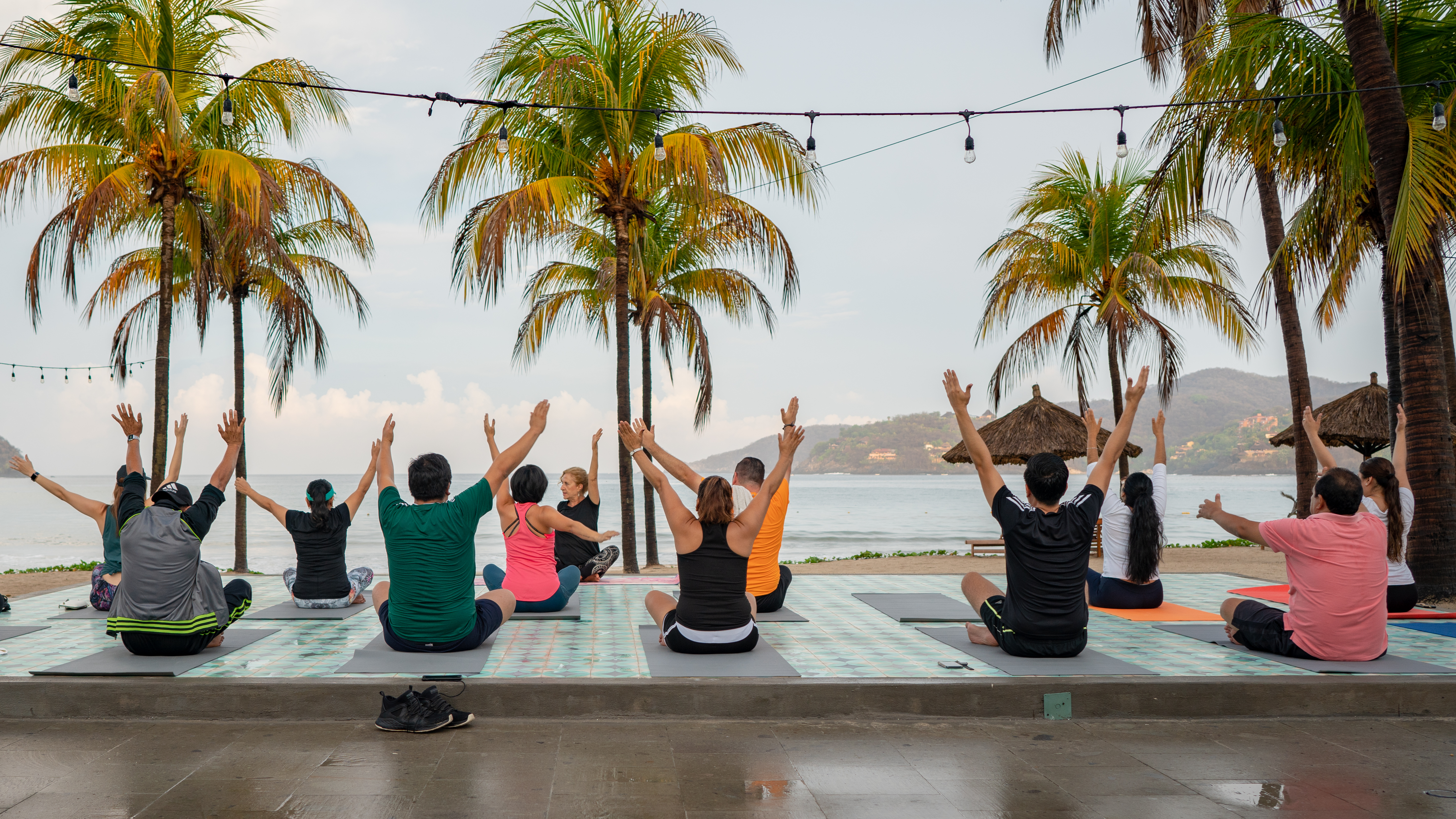
Morning yoga by a beach in Mexico

Modern yoga came to Latin America linked to meditation and a desire for spirituality, sometimes with Buddhist meditation. It often conforms to the image of an unbranded "hatha yoga" that Beatrix Hauser has described as a "gentle, recreational, feminized, pacifist, and non-competitive practice". It has been seen there as a belief, a health technique, a philosophy, a practice, and a religious path. An early influence was Yogananda's Autobiography of a Yogi, available in Spanish from 1951. Before that, early in the 20th century, Mexico's president Francisco I. Madero mentioned Indian philosophy; the English occultist Aleister Crowley practised yoga in Mexico; and Yogananda visited Mexico in 1929. Practitioners, "yogis", are usually urban, not formally initiated, and not renunciates, but many are vegetarians and believe in non-violence. There is an orientalism and a religious feeling in yoga spaces. Yoga is practised mainly by converts from Catholicism. Each country has its own national yoga association. "Hatha yoga" is followed in popularity by Vinyāsa yoga, Iyengar Yoga, and Ashtanga Yoga as established in the US and Europe. Yoga retreats are often held in attractive places like forests and beaches.

A major group in the region is the International Society for Krishna Consciousness (ISKCON), which Srila Prabhupada brought to Mexico in 1971; it practises a devotional and ethical (but not physical) yoga, and is established in at least 17 Latin American countries. Swami Muktananda visited Mexico in 1975, establishing his Siddha Yoga there; it has spread to 5 other Latin American countries. Devotees practise meditation, chanting, and mantra repetition. Yoga as exercise was encouraged by the French guru Serge Raynaud de la Ferrière, who visited Venezuela in 1948, establishing the Universal Great Brotherhood (Gran Fraternidad Universal); it has spread to countries including Mexico and Costa Rica. In Brazil, Mexico, and Peru, syncretisms of meditation, yoga, and indigenous purification rituals have been created.

=== Korea ===
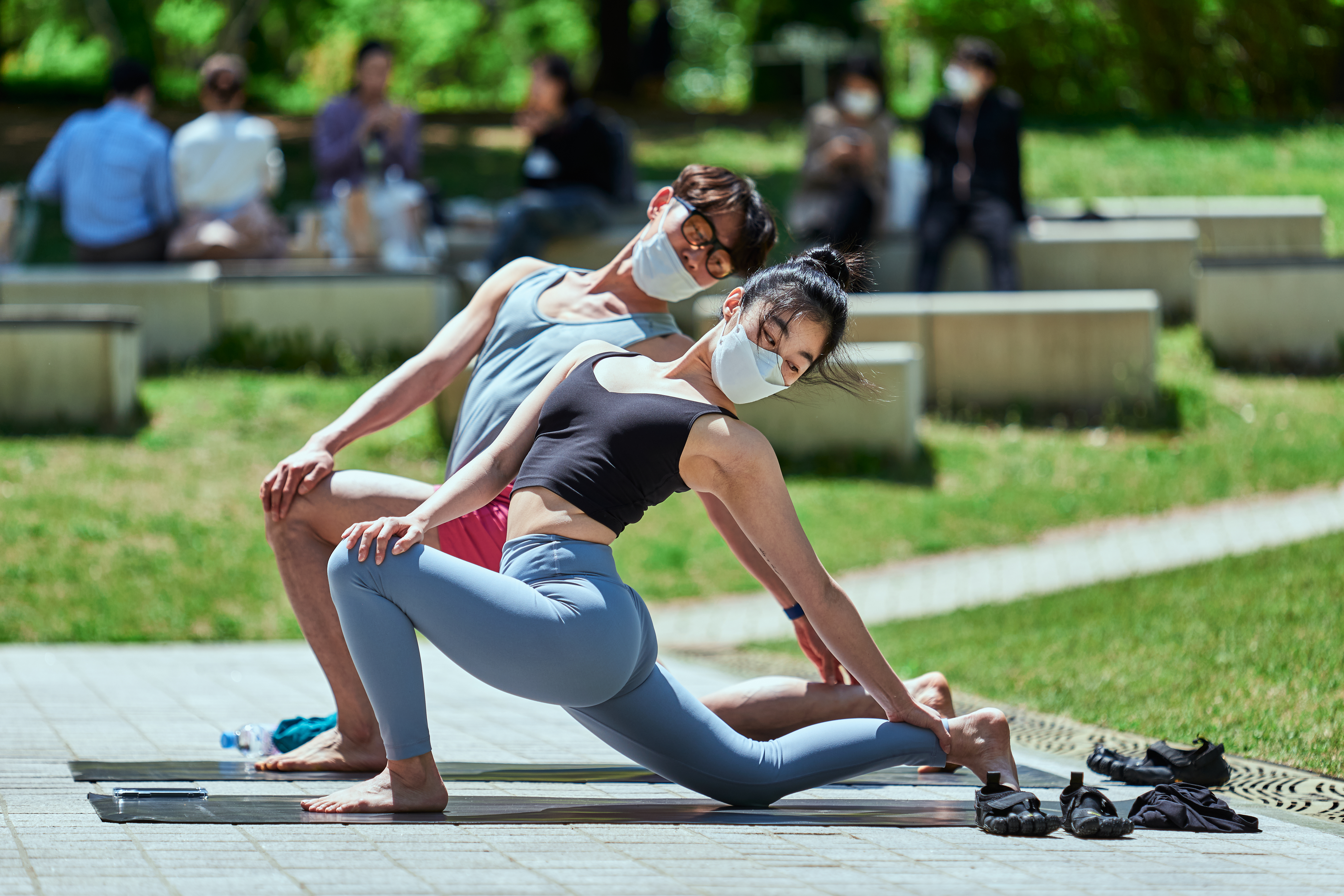
Yoga in Seoul

A yoga centre was founded in Seoul in 1955. In the 1980s, in the form of meditation and controlled breathing (pranayama). These aligned with Korean approaches to the breath, and in the 1990s, many Koreans travelled to India to learn more. Around 2000, a more asana-centred yoga was introduced. By 2020, Korea had some 10 yoga organisations providing hatha yoga, hot yoga, and yoga as therapy, and community yoga classes are widespread. Korean scholars are starting to research multiple aspects of modern yoga, and medieval haṭha yoga texts are being translated into Korean. One of the first was the Haṭha yoga pradīpika, translated in 2015.

== Sources ==
- Alter, Joseph (2004). Yoga in Modern India: the body between science and philosophy. Princeton University Press. ISBN 978-0-691-11874-1.
- Caycedo, Alfonso (1966). India of Yogis. National Publishing House, University of Michigan.
- Davey, H. E. (2006). Japanese Yoga: The Way of Dynamic Meditation. Berkeley, California: Michi Publishing, Sennin Foundation. ISBN 978-1-880656-60-0. Archived from the original on 21 July 2015.
- De Michelis, Elizabeth (2004). A History of Modern Yoga: Patañjali and Western Esotericism. Continuum International Publishing Group. ISBN 978-0-8264-8772-8. OCLC 51942410.
- Devi, Indra (1953). Forever Young, Forever Healthy:Simplified Yoga for Modern Living. Prentice-Hall. OCLC 652377847.
- Goldberg, Elliott (2016). The Path of Modern Yoga: the history of an embodied spiritual practice. Inner Traditions. ISBN 978-1-62055-567-5. OCLC 926062252.
- Hauser, Beatrix (2013). Yoga Traveling: Bodily Practice in Transcultural Perspective. Austria: Springer. ISBN 978-3319003146.
- Iyengar, B. K. S. (2006). Light on Life: The Yoga Journey to Wholeness, Inner Peace, and Ultimate Freedom. Rodale. ISBN 978-1-59486-524-4.
- Acri, Andrea (2021). "Yoga and Meditation Traditions in Insular Southeast Asia". In Newcombe, Suzanne; O'Brien-Kop, Karen (eds.). Routledge Handbook of Yoga and Meditation Studies. Routledge. pp. 273–290. ISBN 978-1-138-48486-3.
- Kurita, Hidehiko (2021). "The Political History of Meditation and Yoga in Japan". In Newcombe, Suzanne; O'Brien-Kop, Karen (eds.). Routledge Handbook of Yoga and Meditation Studies. Routledge. pp. 307–324. ISBN 978-1-138-48486-3.
- Lidell, Lucy; The Sivananda Yoga Centre (1983). The Book of Yoga: the complete step-by-step guide. Ebury. ISBN 978-0-85223-297-2. OCLC 12457963.
- Mehta, Silva; Mehta, Mira; Mehta, Shyam (1990). Yoga: The Iyengar Way. Dorling-Kindersley. ISBN 978-0-86318-420-8.
- Mohan, A. G. (2010). Krishnamacharya: His Life and Teachings. Shambhala Publications. p. 11. ISBN 978-1-59030-800-4.
- Muñoz, Adrian (2021). "Yoga in Latin America: A Critical Overview". In Newcombe, Suzanne; O'Brien-Kop, Karen (eds.). Routledge Handbook of Yoga and Meditation Studies. Routledge. pp. 335–349. ISBN 978-1-138-48486-3.
- Newcombe, Suzanne (2017). "The Revival of Yoga in Contemporary India" (PDF). In Barton, John (ed.). Oxford Research Encyclopedias: Religion. Oxford: Oxford University Press. doi:10.1093/acrefore/9780199340378.013.253. ISBN 978-0-19-934037-8. Archived (PDF) from the original on 5 September 2019.
- Newcombe, Suzanne; Deslippe, Philip (2021). "Anglophone Yoga and Meditation Outside of India". In Newcombe, Suzanne; O'Brien-Kop, Karen (eds.). Routledge Handbook of Yoga and Meditation Studies. Routledge. pp. 350–365. ISBN 978-1-138-48486-3.
- Park, Kwangsoo; Park, Younggil (2021). "Meditation and Yoga in Korea". In Newcombe, Suzanne; O'Brien-Kop, Karen (eds.). Routledge Handbook of Yoga and Meditation Studies. Routledge. pp. 325–334. ISBN 978-1-138-48486-3.
- Pratinidhi, Bhawanrao Shrinivasrao Pant (1938) [1929]. Morgan, Louise (ed.). The Ten-Point Way to Health = Surya Namaskars. London: J. M. Dent. OCLC 156801198.
- Reiyō, Matsuda (1916). Saishin seishin ryōhō [The Latest Psychospiritual Therapy] (in Japanese). Tokyo: Kōhōsha.
- Schrank, Sarah (2014). "American Yoga: The Shaping of Modern Body Culture in the United States". American Studies. 53 (1): 169–182. doi:10.1353/ams.2014.0021. S2CID 144698814. Archived from the original on 28 April 2019.
- Shearer, Alistair (2020). The Story of Yoga: from Ancient India to the Modern West. C. Hurst & Co. ISBN 978-1-78738-192-6. OCLC 1089012347.
- Shupe, Anson D. (1998). Wolves Within the Fold: Religious Leadership and Abuses of Power. Rutgers University Press. ISBN 978-0-8135-2489-4.
- Singleton, Mark (2010). Yoga Body: the origins of modern posture practice. Oxford University Press. ISBN 978-0-19-539534-1. OCLC 318191988.
- Stein, Justin B. (2024). "Religion, Ki, and Aikido: From Pre-war Japan to the Post-war United States". Vienna Journal of East Asian Studies. 16 (1): 194–222.
- Syman, Stefanie (2010). The Subtle Body: the Story of Yoga in America. Farrar, Straus and Giroux. ISBN 978-0-374-53284-0. OCLC 456171421.
- Worth, Naomi (2021). "Yoga in Tibet". In Newcombe, Suzanne; O'Brien-Kop, Karen (eds.). Routledge Handbook of Yoga and Meditation Studies. Routledge. pp. 291–306. ISBN 978-1-138-48486-3.
- Yogendra (1928). Yoga Asanas Simplified. The Yoga Institute. OCLC 58817499.
