= Garbha Pindasana =

Difficult balancing posture in hatha yoga

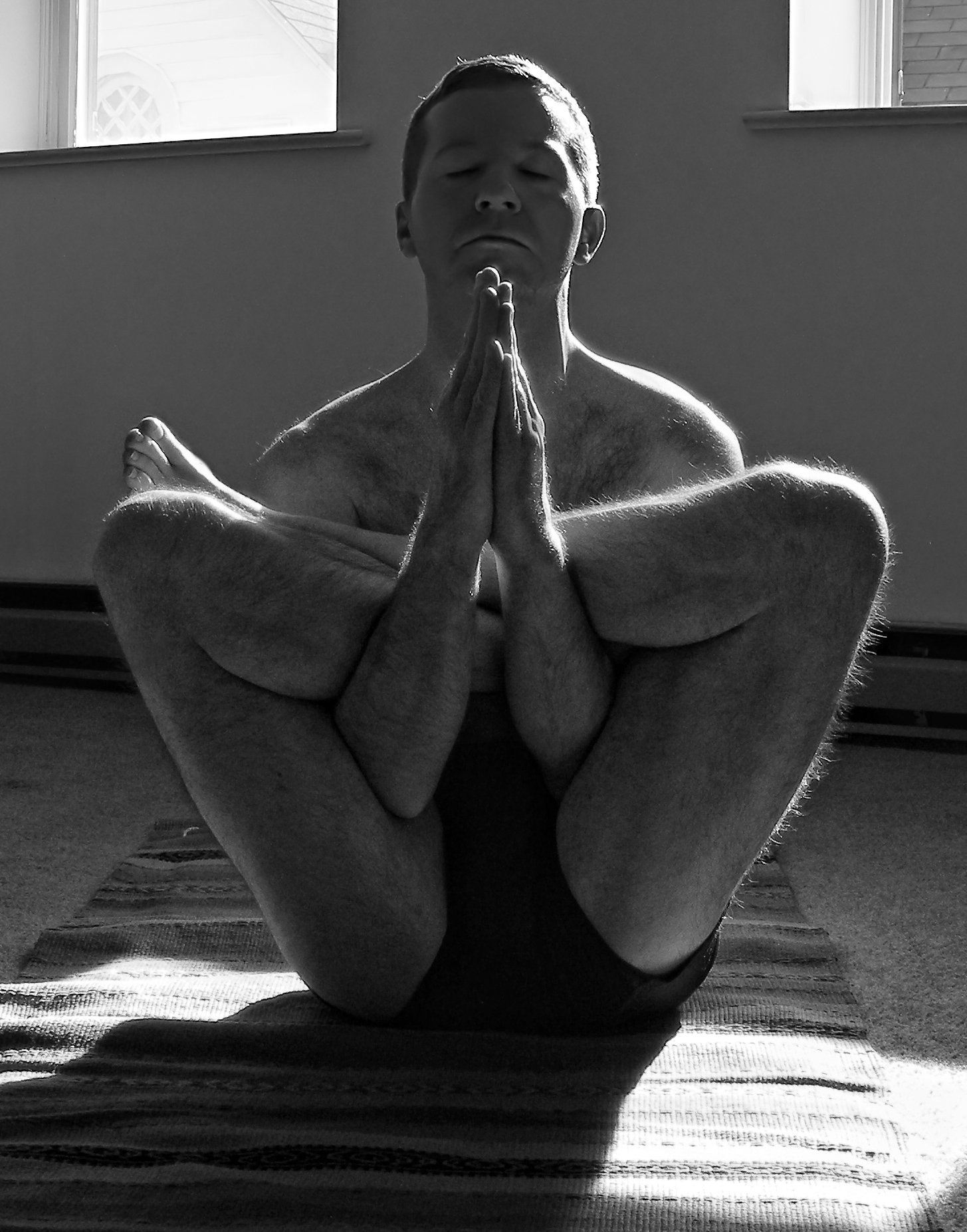
Garbha Pindasana, variant with hands in Anjali Mudra

Garbha Pindasana (Sanskrit: गर्भ पिण्डासन, IAST: Garbha Piṇḍāsana), Embryo in Womb Pose, sometimes shortened to Garbhasana, is a seated balancing asana in hatha yoga and modern yoga as exercise.

The pose is identical to Uttana Kurmasana, the inverted tortoise pose, except that the body is on the back in that pose instead of balancing upright.

== Etymology and origins ==
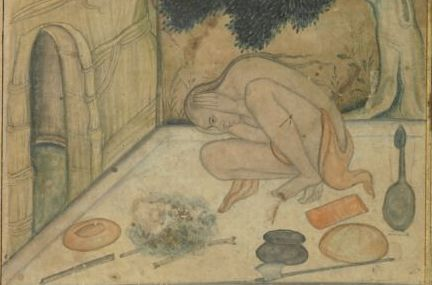
Garbhasana in the Bahr al-Hayat, c. 1602

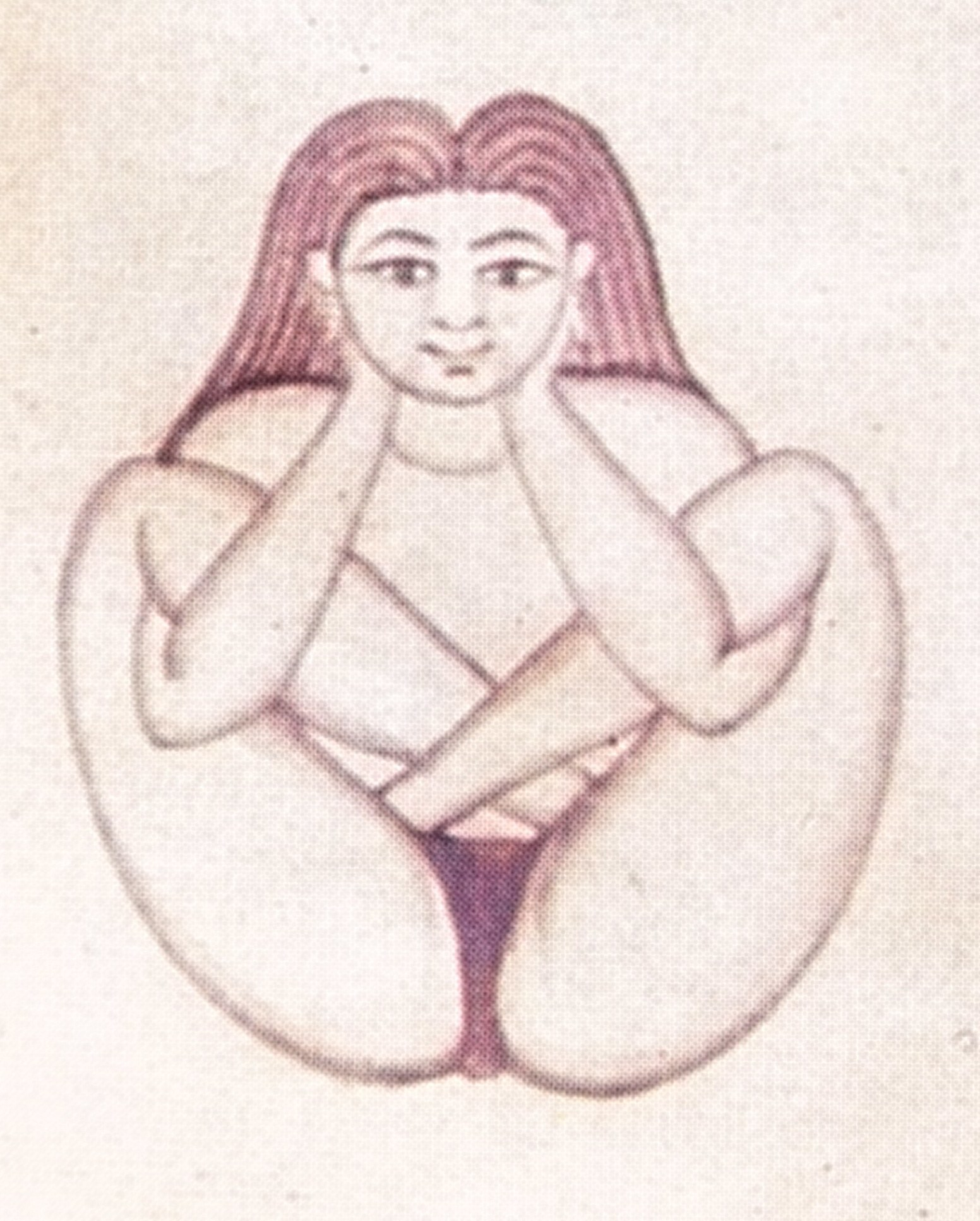
Uttana Kurmasana from the 19th century Sritattvanidhi, identical to Garbha Pindasana but reclining, hands grasping the ears

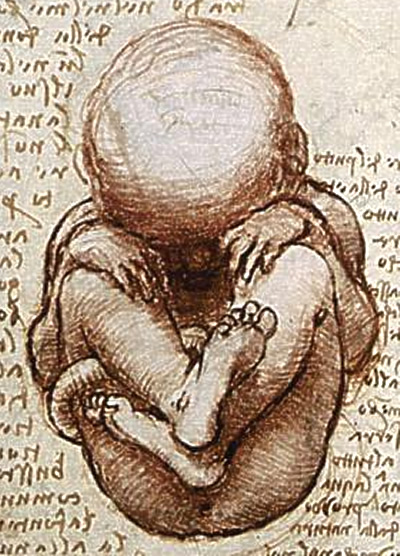
Drawing of a foetus in womb by Leonardo da Vinci, c. 1511

The name comes from the Sanskrit words garbha meaning "womb"; piṇḍa meaning "embryo" or "foetus"; and āsana (आसन) meaning "posture" or "seat".

The pose is described in the 17th century Bahr al-Hayāt.

The limb positions of Garbha Pindasana are identical to those in Uttana Kurmasana, which is illustrated in the 19th century Sritattvanidhi.

== Description ==
The legs are crossed in Padmasana; practitioners who cannot easily keep the feet in Padmasana may cross the legs in Sukhasana. The arms are threaded through behind the knees, and the hands then reach up to grasp the ears. The body is then balanced on the coccyx (the tailbone).

In Ashtanga (vinyasa) yoga, the pose is in the primary series.

== Variations ==
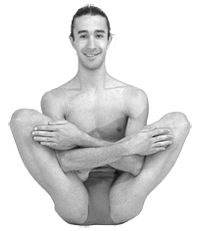
Variant arm position

The arm position may be varied.

Another form is the reclining Supta Garbhasana with the ankles crossed behind the neck, the same as Yoganidrasana.

== Claims ==
Twentieth century advocates of some schools of yoga, such as B. K. S. Iyengar, made claims for the effects of yoga on specific organs, without adducing any evidence. Iyengar claimed that this pose makes the blood circulate well around the abdominal organs, which are "contracted completely", keeping them "in trim".

== See also ==
- List of asanas

== Sources ==
- Iyengar, B. K. S. (1979) [1966]. Light on Yoga: Yoga Dipika. Unwin Paperbacks. ISBN 978-1855381667.
- Jain, Andrea (2015). Selling Yoga: from Counterculture to Pop Culture. Oxford University Press. ISBN 978-0-19-939024-3. OCLC 878953765.
- Newcombe, Suzanne (2019). Yoga in Britain: Stretching Spirituality and Educating Yogis. Bristol, England: Equinox Publishing. ISBN 978-1-78179-661-0.
- Sjoman, Norman E. (1999) [1996]. The Yoga Tradition of the Mysore Palace (2nd ed.). Abhinav Publications. ISBN 81-7017-389-2.
