= Bahr al-Hayat =

1602 illustrated book by Muhammad Ghawth

Bahr al-Hayāt
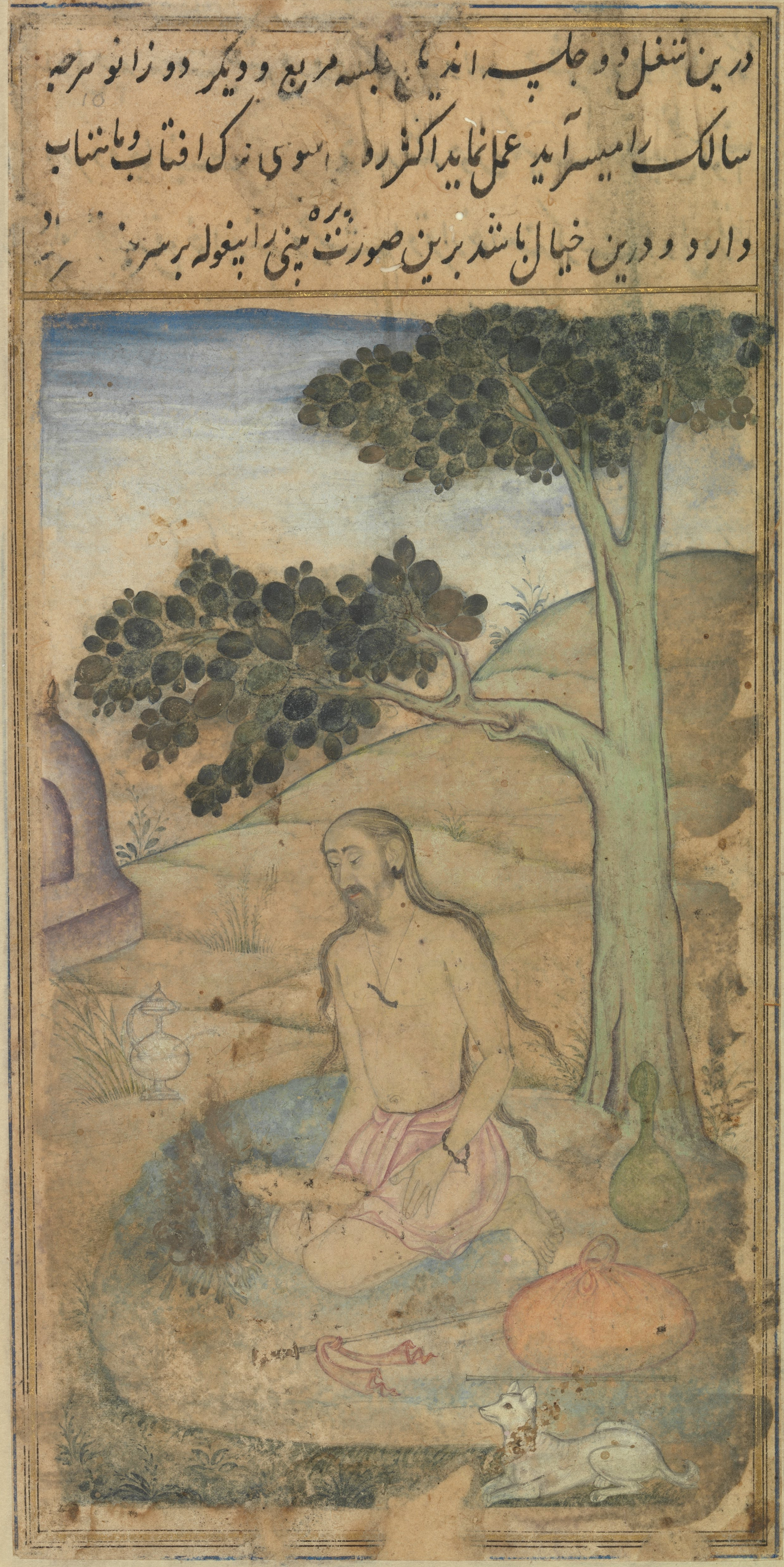
- Painting of yoga asana Virasana in Persian manuscript Bahr al-Hayāt, c. 1602
- Author: Muhammad Ghawth Gwaliyari
- Language: Persian
- Subject: Yoga asanas
- Published: 1602
- Publication place: India

The Bahr al-Hayāt (lit. 'Ocean of Life') is an illustrated Persian book, written c. 1602 by Muhammad Ghawth, which covers topics including asanas used for meditation. It is probably the first illustrated textbook of yoga.

== Book ==
=== Origins ===
A lost Indian text named Amrtakunda (lit. 'Pool of Nectar') written in either Hindi or Sanskrit was supposedly translated into Arabic as Hawd ma' al-Hayāt (lit. 'Pool of the Water of Life') in Bengal in 1210; though the scholar Carl Ernst suggests that the translation was actually made by a Persian scholar, perhaps in the 15th century, who had travelled to India and observed Nath yogis practising hatha yoga. The qadhi of Lakhnauti, Ruknuddin, is said to have converted the famous Kamarupan yogi known as Bhojar Brahman to Islam. The Amrtakunda was then given to the qadhi who then translated it into Arabic as Hawdh al-Hayat. He also translated it into Persian as Bahr al-Hayat.

However, there are other theories as well. It is suggested that in the 16th century, the Indian Sufi master Muhammad Ghawth Gwaliyari translated the Arabic text into Persian, and expanded the text greatly (paralleling, Ernst observes, the change in title from Pool to Ocean). Among other extensions, the account of yoga increased from 5 to 21 asanas.

=== Illustrated handbook of hatha yoga ===
The Bahr al-Hayāt is of interest as the first illustrated handbook of hatha yoga. It depicts a yogi performing 22 asanas; it describes and illustrates postures including Gorakshasana; Kukkutasana, the cockerel pose, which it calls Thamba āsana; Kurmasana, (Note: The account and illustration are of a different pose from the modern Kurmasana.) the turtle pose; Uttana Kurmasana, which it calls Vajrasana; the yoga headstand; and Garbhasana, the embryo in the womb pose. It mentions also the seated asanas Padmasana and Siddhasana. Among other practices, it describes the khecarī mudrā, the elongation and folding back of the tongue so as to seal the passage to the nose; and anahad, blocking the ears so as to hear the unstruck sound of the eternal. (Note: The purpose of khechari is to prevent the loss of the bindu fluid, and so to prolong life.)

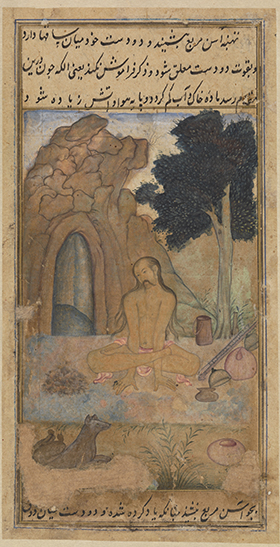
Kukkutasana

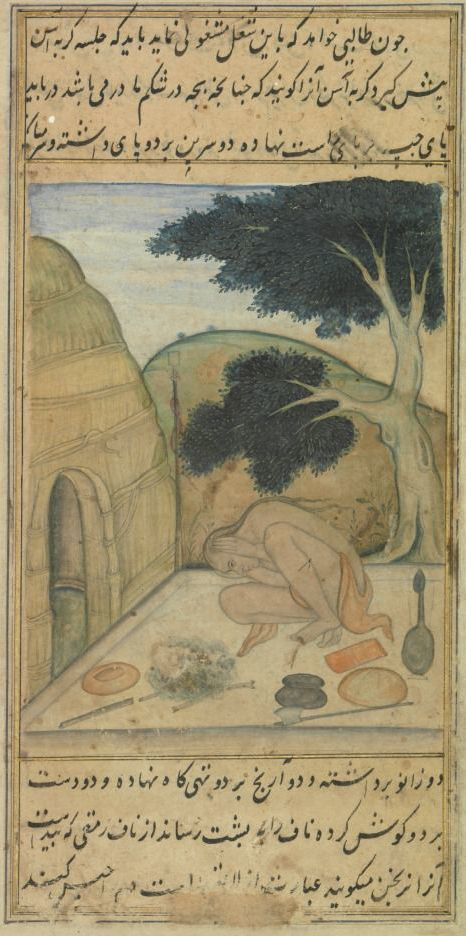
Garbhasana

=== Parallels between yoga and Sufism ===
Ghawth presents yoga as in many ways equivalent to Sufism; for example, he equates the 7 Sanskrit mantras that are linked to the 7 chakras with some of the Arabic names of God; the unconscious mantra so ham (सो ऽहम्, "I am That") which is the sound made as one breathes in and out, is equated to the Arabic rabb al-arbab, "the Lord of Lords"; and as one last example of many, the Hindu sage Matsyendranath (his name meaning "Lord of Fishes" in Sanskrit) is equated to Jonah, who is swallowed by a great fish. More directly, Ghawth states that the personal mystic experiences of yogins and Sufis are alike.

== Sources ==
- Gwaliyari, Muhammad Ghawth; Ernst, Carl W. (trans.) (2013) [1602]. Yoga: The Art of Transformation | Chapter 4 of the Bahr al-hayat, by Muhammad Ghawth Gwaliyari. Archived from the original on 2019-09-13.
- Mallinson, James; Singleton, Mark (2017). Roots of Yoga. Penguin Books. ISBN 978-0-241-25304-5. OCLC 928480104.
- Ernst, Carl W. (2016). "Chapter 8: Sufism and Yoga according to Muhammad Ghawth". Refractions of Islam in India: Situating Sufism and Yoga. Sage. pp. 121–129. ISBN 978-93-5150-964-6.
