= Yoganidrasana =

Reclining forward-bending posture in modern yoga

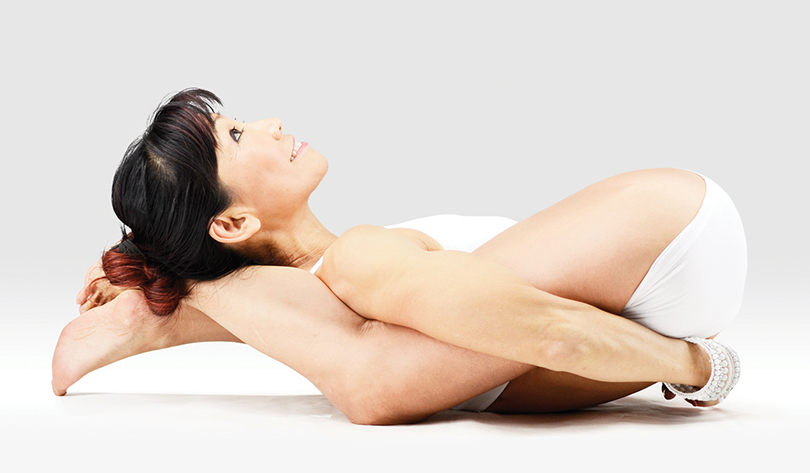
Yoganidrasana

Yoganidrasana, (Sanskrit: योगनिद्रासन) or Yogic Sleep Pose is a reclining forward-bending asana in modern yoga as exercise. It is sometimes called Supta Garbhasana (Reclining Embryo Pose). The name Dvi Pada Sirsasana is given to the balancing form of the pose.

In hatha yoga, the pose was used in Pasini Mudra, the noose mudra, a seal to prevent the escape of prana; it was not an asana.

== Etymology and origins as a mudra ==
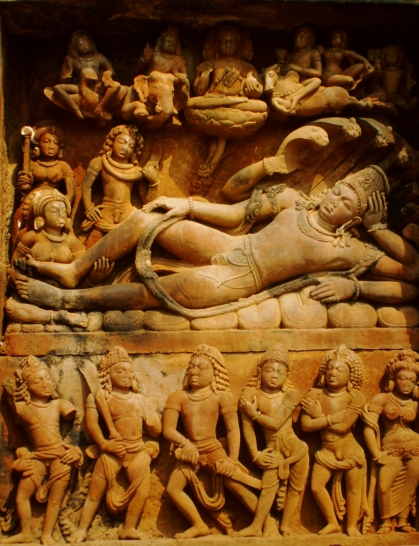
Vishnu asleep on Ananta. Deogarh Temple, Dasavatara

The name of this pose comes from योग yoga meaning "uniting", निद्र nidra meaning "sleep", and आसन āsana meaning "posture" or "seat". The asana's name derives from the yogic sleep mentioned in the Hindu epic Mahabharata:

[The Ocean] becomes the bed of the lotus-naveled Vishnu when at the termination of every Yuga that deity of immeasurable power enjoys yoga nidra, the deep sleep under the spell of spiritual meditation.

— Mahabharata, Book 1, section XXI

Yoganidrasana is described in the 17th century Haṭha Ratnāvalī 3.70. The pose is illustrated in an 18th-century painting of the eight yoga chakras in Mysore. It is illustrated as "Pasini Mudra" (not an asana) in Theos Bernard's 1943 book Hatha Yoga: The Report of A Personal Experience. Pasini Mudra is described in the Gheranda Samhita 3.84: "Throw the two legs on the neck towards the back, holding them strongly together like a noose (Paśa). This is called Paśini Mudra; it awakens the Shakti (Kundalini)." In the 20th century, the pose appears as an asana in works such as the 1966 Light on Yoga.

== Description ==
In Yoganidrasana, the back is on the ground, the feet are crossed behind the head, and the arms are wrapped around the legs and body, the hands clasped behind the lower back. The effect is of a strong forward bend; B. K. S. Iyengar rates its difficulty as 18 out of 60. The practice is said to warm the body rapidly.

In Ashtanga (vinyasa) yoga, the pose is in the intermediate series.

== Variations ==
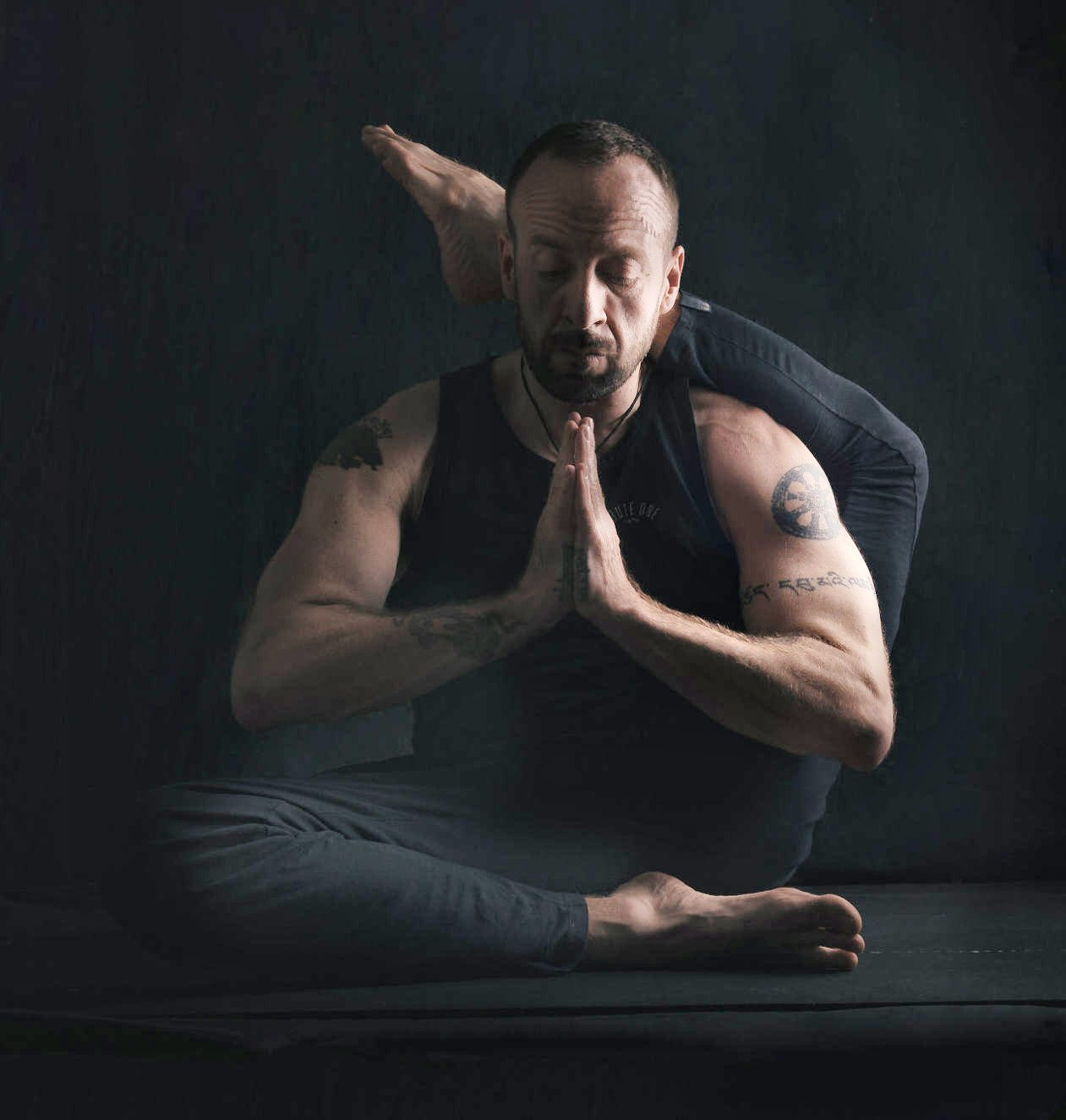
Eka Pada Sirsasana, an advanced preparatory pose for Dvi Pada Sirsasana

Dvi Pada Sirsasana (Sanskrit: द्विपाद शीर्षासन dvi pāda śīrṣāsana, literally "two foot head pose" and in English "Both Feet Behind the Head pose") has the same limb positions, but the body is balanced upright. This is difficult, as there is a tendency to fall backwards. A preparatory pose, also advanced, is Eka Pada Sirsasana, in which just one foot is placed behind the head. The names of the two poses are confused in literature. Light on Yoga uses the name Eka Pada Sirsasana both for the preparation for Dvi Pada Sirsasana, and for a headstand with one leg up, one leg down, a variation of Sirsasana. In Sivananda Yoga, as described by Vishnudevananda Saraswati, the pose with both feet behind the head is named "Dwipada Sirasan" (sic) or "head-knee pose". Other authors treat Dvi Pada Sirsasana (a Headstand variation) and Janusirsasana (Head to Knee Pose, a forward bend) as quite different poses. In the 19th century Sritattvanidhi, another pose named Aranyachatakasana, the Forest Sparrow Pose, was described and illustrated. It matches Light on Yoga's description of Dvi Pada Sirsasana.

== See also ==
- Garbha Pindasana – another upright pose with a similar arrangement
- Uttana Kurmasana – a seated forward bending pose with a similar leg position
- Yoganidra – "yogic sleep", a meditative reclining practice

== Sources ==
- Iyengar, B. K. S. (1979) [1966]. Light on Yoga: Yoga Dipika. Thorsons. ISBN 978-1855381667.
- Sjoman, Norman E. (1999). The Yoga Tradition of the Mysore Palace. Abhinav Publications. ISBN 81-7017-389-2.
- Vishnudevananda, Swami (1988) [1960]. The Complete Illustrated Book of Yoga. Three Rivers Press. ISBN 0-517-88431-3.
