= Yoga in Britain: Stretching Spirituality and Educating Yogis =

2019 book by Suzanne Newcombe

Yoga in Britain
- Front cover of the first edition showing a class in Sarvangasana, shoulderstand
- Author: Suzanne Newcombe
- Language: English
- Subject: Yoga as exercise
- Genre: Non-fiction
- Publisher: Equinox Publishing
- Publication date: 2019
- Publication place: England
- Pages: 324 (first edition)
- ISBN: 978-1-781-79660-3

Yoga in Britain: stretching spirituality and educating Yogis is a 2019 book by Suzanne Newcombe on the history of modern yoga as exercise in Britain in the second half of the 20th century, especially in the period between 1945 and 1980. The book has been warmly received by scholars for its depth of study of the history and sociology of yoga in Britain, and its careful placing of its descriptions in specific contexts of time and place.

== Context ==
Yoga is an ancient spiritual practice from India. The form in which it is widely known in the western world, yoga as exercise, was developed from medieval Hatha Yoga in the early 20th century by pioneers including Krishnamacharya, as described by scholars including Mark Singleton. The new physical practice was brought to Britain in various forms during the 20th century, including by one of Krishnamacharya's pupils, B. K. S. Iyengar.

Suzanne Newcombe is a scholar of modern yoga, investigating the "interfaces between religion, health and healing". She researches and teaches at the Open University.

== Book ==
=== Publication history ===
Yoga in Britain was published in paperback by Equinox in 2019, simultaneously in Sheffield, England and Bristol, Connecticut.

=== Synopsis ===
Yoga in Britain begins with a "Prologue" that describes modern yoga as a worldwide practice, briefly tracing its roots in the ancient spiritual practices of India's various religions. It notes the origins of postural yoga in Hatha Yoga from around 1100 AD, and states, following Andrea Jain and others, that since yoga has varying meanings and practices in different contexts, it must be studied in a specific context.

The book's eight chapters each provide a "vignette" of yoga in a certain time and place in Britain. The first looks at the early business of publishing information about yoga, complete with a graph of the number of yoga books published by year from 1940 to 1990, peaking in 1978. The book then examines the early self-taught yogis; the role of charismatic yoga gurus in adult education; the arrival of yoga evening classes for middle-class women; the 1960s, where yoga was associated with rock music and the counter-culture; yoga on television; yoga as therapy; and a tour of the diversity of yoga practice in Britain.

The book ends with a "Postscript" describing how yoga has developed in Britain since 1980, with increasing formalisation and commercialisation.

=== Illustrations ===
The book is illustrated with 40 monochrome photographs of yoga pioneers, early classes, graphics, and historical artefacts, and a table of estimated numbers of practitioners in Britain.

== Reception ==
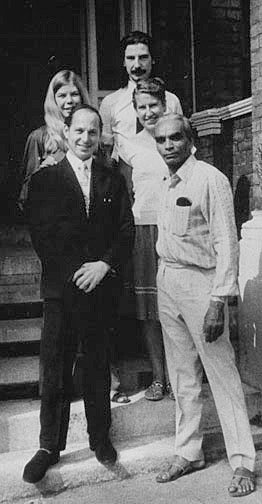
B. K. S. Iyengar at Iyengar Centre House, London, 1971

Yoga in Britain has been warmly welcomed by other scholars. Anna Lutkajtis, in the Alternative Spirituality and Religion Review , notes that yoga needs to be studied in context, and that the British model of teaching yoga to adults in non-vocational evening classes described by Newcombe provided "the initial model for the yoga classes we see today". Matylda Ciołkosz, in the Journal of Yoga Studies, describes the book as long-awaited, with key themes of education and the "privatisation of religion and spirituality". She examines, too, what she calls the "institutionalisation of charisma", as seen in the work of Iyengar in Britain, leading to the professionalisation of yoga instruction in Iyengar Yoga. Amelia Wood, in Numen, states that the central question addressed by the book is

how can this thing called 'yoga' that is apparently Indian now be seen as such an unremarkable activity in Britain?

Wood at once adds that the ways that yoga was made popular in postwar Britain were more remarkable, revealed by Newcombe's extensive sociological and historical research. She states that the punning subtitle indicates the changing meaning of "yoga", adding physical activity. In her view, the book shows that while yoga did become entangled with the 1960s counter-culture, yoga flourished in Britain by going along with the mainstream, with conventional "agendas of improving health, education, and contentment". Wood notes that most British yoga teachers and practitioners are still women, and calls for further study based on Newcombe of how yoga upholds—or challenges—gender norms. The scholar of religion Anne Koch, in the Journal of Religion in Europe, calls the book a "thoroughly scrutinised monograph", the product of over 15 years of study, supported by extensive fieldwork involving contact with many practitioners from the period of study. All the same, Koch notes, several contexts remain to be explored, such as the influence of Vivekananda on British yoga, and the role of the Theosophical Society. She finds the book valuable for its many original sources, photographs, and interviews.

== Sources ==
- Ciołkosz, Matylda (2019). "Book Review: Yoga in Britain". Journal of Yoga Studies. 2: 71–73. doi:10.34000/JoYS.2019.V2.003.
- Koch, Anne (2020). "Yoga in Britain: Stretching Spirituality and Educating Yogis, written by Suzanne Newcombe". Journal of Religion in Europe. 12 (3): 343–345. doi:10.1163/18748929-01203007. ISSN 1874-8910.
- Lutkajtis, Anna (2019). "Suzanne Newcombe, Yoga in Britain: Stretching Spirituality and Educating Yogis". Alternative Spirituality and Religion Review. 10 (2): 286–288. doi:10.5840/asrr201910272. ISSN 1946-0538. S2CID 213213322.
- Miller, Christopher Patrick (2019). "Yoga in Britain: Stretching Spirituality and Educating Yogis, by Suzanne Newcombe". Religions of South Asia. 12 (3): 413–416. doi:10.1558/rosa.39893. ISSN 1751-2689.
- Newcombe, Suzanne (2019). Yoga in Britain: Stretching Spirituality and Educating Yogis. Equinox. ISBN 978-1781796610.
- Wood, Amelia (2020). "Yoga in Britain: Stretching Spirituality and Educating Yogis, written by Suzanne Newcombe". Numen. 67 (4): 429–431. doi:10.1163/15685276-12341594. ISSN 0029-5973. S2CID 219917614.
