= Karen O'Brien-Kop =

Karen O'Brien-Kop is a lecturer in Modern Asian Religions at King's College London.

== Life ==
Karen O'Brien-Kop gained her PhD at SOAS University of London, studying early Buddhist and Hindu texts on the philosophy of mind and body. She worked for a while as a teaching fellow at SOAS. She then became a lecturer in Asian religions and ethics at the University of Roehampton. She then moved to King's College London where she is a lecturer in Modern Asian Religions. She is co-editor of the Religions of South Asia journal.

O'Brien-Kop appeared as an expert on BBC Radio 4's In Our Time programme in the 2024 episode "Karma".

== Reception ==
Alan Brill, writing in Journal of Contemplative Studies, describes the essays in Routledge Handbook of Yoga and Meditation Studies as solid introductions, while the editors' influence is seen "in bold and robust discussions" of the cultural issues involved. He notes the editors' apology for not covering "sexual and psychological abuse and its cover-up" in yoga and meditation. In his view, the book does not cover Tantra and Buddhism sufficiently, but should be "a valuable classroom resource" for students, and should serve as a guide for researchers to the scholarly literature.

Dhruv Raj Nagar, reviewing Rethinking 'Classical Yoga' and Buddhism: Meditation, Metaphors and Materiality in The Journal of Religion, writes that metaphors have to be taken seriously, and that O'Brien-Kop "is at her creative best when unearthing these metaphorical structures, and therefore the underlying conceptual order, undergirding early Indian soteriology." In his view, the book "makes a compelling and timely case for the inclusion of Buddhist texts such as the Yogācārabhūmiśāstra into the yoga canon, thus broadening our understanding of yoga beyond its Brahmanical articulations."

Franz Höllinger, reviewing Religion, Spirituality and Public Health: Competing and Complementary Epistemes in the Journal of Contemporary Religion, writes that the book was written in the aftermath of the COVID-19 pandemic and the realisation that it engendered that the system of understanding (episteme) of "modern scientific biomedicine" was by no means the only practical response to such a pandemic's challenges to public health. Instead, there were numerous "geographies of reason" that could be applied depending on the context. In his view, the book principally consists of diverse case studies conducted as ethnography using qualitative research methods. He comments that much of the work assumes that the epistemology behind religious and spiritual healing is "essentially based on physical and sensory experiences", or in O'Brien-Kop's words, on "embodied rationalities".

== Books ==
=== Written ===
- O'Brien-Kop, Karen (2022). Rethinking 'Classical Yoga' and Buddhism: Meditation, Metaphors and Materiality. Bloomsbury Academic. ISBN 978-1350230033.

=== Edited ===
- Newcombe, Suzanne; O'Brien-Kop, Karen, eds. (2021). Routledge Handbook of Yoga and Meditation Studies. Routledge. doi:10.4324/9781351050753. ISBN 978-1-138-48486-3.
- Newcombe, Suzanne; O'Brien-Kop, Karen, eds. (2025). Religion, Spirituality and Public Health: Competing and Complementary Epistemes. British Academy, Liverpool University Press. doi:10.2307/jj.31510241.
