= Suzanne Newcombe =

Suzanne Newcombe researches the modern history of yoga and new and minority religions. She states that she is particularly interested in "the interfaces between religion, health and healing." She is known in particular for her work on yoga for women and yoga in Britain.

== Early life and education ==
Suzanne Newcombe grew up in Kansas, daughter of Jim and Susan Hasselle; she is married to the Iyengar yoga teacher Alaric Newcombe. She studied religion at Amherst College in Massachusetts with a year at SOAS in London. She took a master's degree in Religion in Contemporary Society at the London School of Economics. She obtained her PhD at the University of Cambridge on the popularisation of yoga and ayurvedic medicine in Britain.

== Career ==
Newcombe is a senior lecturer at the Open University, working on the sociology and social history of modern and contemporary religion, publishing particularly in the areas of modern yoga and Ayurveda. She joined the Open University as an associate lecturer in 2008 and became a full-time member of their Religious Studies department in 2016. She edits and helped to found the Journal of Yoga Studies, and the "Modern Yoga Research" website. She was a researcher on the European Research Council funded AYURYOG: Entangled Histories of Yoga, Ayurveda and Alchemy in South Asia project which ran from 2015-2020. Newcombe has appeared on BBC radio and television to discuss modern yoga and religious practices. She has previously lectured in sociology and divinity at Kingston University, the London School of Economics and the University of Cambridge.

Since 2020, she has been the honorary director of INFORM based in Theology and Religious Studies at King's College London.

Newcombe appeared on ABC News 20/20's broadcast on the subject of the Heaven's Gate Cult and spoke that everyone is potentially susceptible to joining a cult stating that "No one ever joins a Cult".

== Reception ==
Susan J. Palmer, reviewing Prophecy in the New Millennium for the Review of Religious Research, called the book "a rich and ground-breaking study that should stimulate a fresh interest in this enigmatic phenomenon."

Benjamin D. Crace, reviewing Prophecy in the New Millennium for Nova Religio, describes it as "a concise introduction to prophecy, its history, current role, and trajectory" that explores why prophecy "continues to persist as modernity fails and the world becomes increasingly interconnected." Crace notes that "some readers will find the narratives more readable and interesting" than the scholarly analysis.

Christopher Patrick Miller described Yoga in Britain for Religions of South Asia as a "detailed and well-researched analysis of the most significant forms of yoga that developed in Britain during the twentieth century... (providing) scholars and yoga practitioners with an original, detailed, and yet easy-to-read history of the development of yoga theory and praxis as it interfaced with twentieth-century Britain."

Susannah Crockford, reviewing the Routledge Handbook of Yoga and Meditation Studies for Nova Religio, writes that "The editors bring together an admirable breadth and depth of knowledge on yoga, and for that alone, this is an essential resource for anyone interested in yoga studies."

== Works ==
=== Edited ===
- Newcombe, Suzanne; Harvey, Sarah, eds. (2013). Prophecy in the new millennium: when prophecies persist. Routledge. ISBN 978-1-4094-4995-9.
- Newcombe, Suzanne; O'Brien-Kop, Karen, eds. (2020). Routledge Handbook of Yoga and Meditation Studies. Routledge. ISBN 978-1-351-05075-3.
- Newcombe, Suzanne; O'Brien-Kop, Karen, eds. (2025). Religion, Spirituality, and Public Health: Competing and Complementary Epistemes. British Academy. ISBN 978-1-83624-564-3.

=== Written ===
- Newcombe, Suzanne (2017). "The Revival of Yoga in Contemporary India". Oxford Research Encyclopedia: Religion. Oxford Research Encyclopedias.
- Newcombe, Suzanne (2019). Yoga in Britain: Stretching Spirituality and Educating Yogis. Equinox Publishing. ISBN 978-1-78179-661-0.
