= Kurmasana =

Seated forward bending posture in hatha yoga

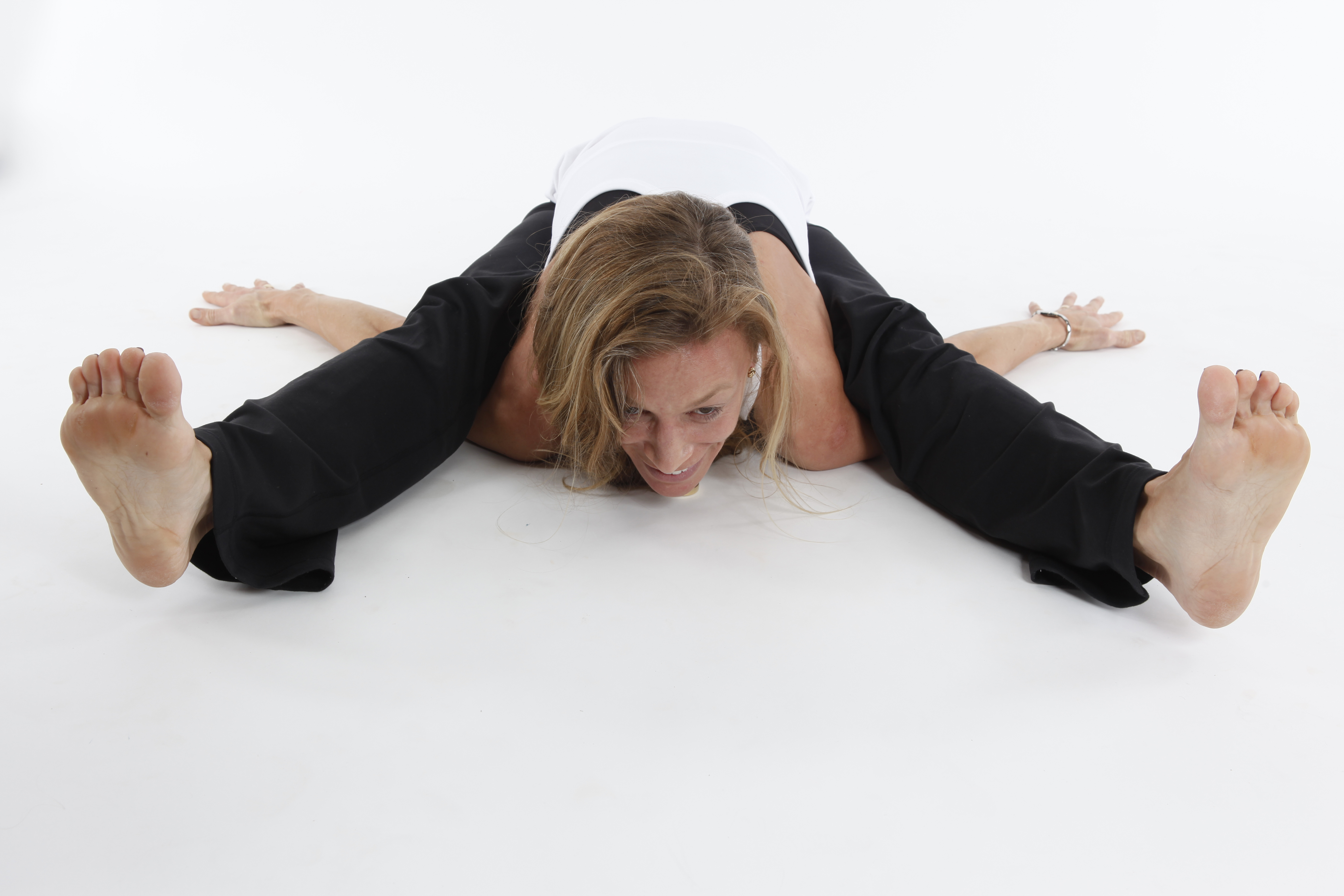
Tortoise Pose, Kurmasana

Kurmasana (Sanskrit: कूर्मासन; IAST: kūrmāsana), Tortoise Pose, or Turtle Pose is a sitting forward bending asana in hatha yoga and modern yoga as exercise.

== Etymology and origins ==
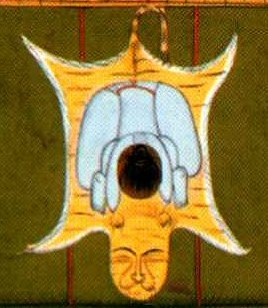
Pose labelled "Kurmasana" in the 18th century Jogapradipika

The name comes from the Sanskrit कूर्म Kūrma, "turtle" or "tortoise" and आसन Āsana, "posture" or "seat".

Uttana Kurmasana is described in the ancient, c. 7th century Ahirbudhnya Saṃhitā, and illustrated in the 19th century Jogapradipika and Sritattvanidhi.

The modern Kurmasana is described in B. K. S. Iyengar's 1966 Light on Yoga. Iyengar states that the asana is dedicated to Kurma, the tortoise incarnation of the god Vishnu.

== Description ==
To enter kūrmāsana a practitioner sits with the legs outstretched, feet as wide apart as possible. The knees are bent slightly, keeping the heels in contact with the floor. The body is leaned forward from the hips and the hands slid under the knees. The body leans forward (bending at the hips) to allow the hands and arms to slide sideways and backward (under the knees) until the elbows lie near the back of the knees. The heels are pushed forward and legs are straightened as much as possible. The forehead or chin is brought to touch the floor. The arms are further brought around the back to interlock the hands under the buttocks.

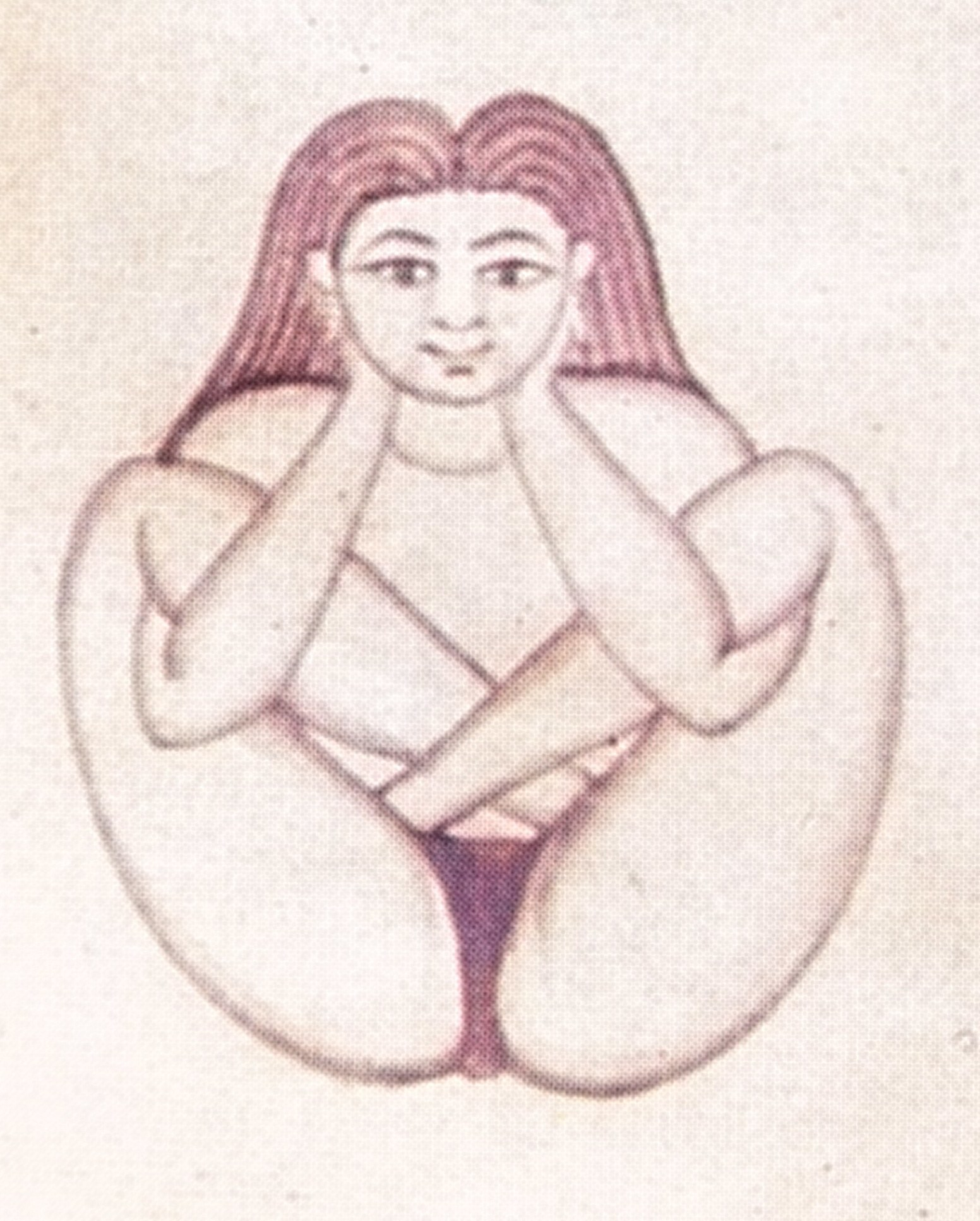
Uttana Kurmasana from the 19th century Sritattvanidhi

== Variations ==
Supta Kurmasana (Sleeping Tortoise Pose) has the forehead on the floor, the feet crossed behind the head, and the arms reaching around the legs, hands clasped behind the back.

Uttana Kurmasana (Upside-Down Tortoise Pose) has the arms threaded through the crossed legs as in Kukkutasana (Cockerel Pose), the back on the ground, and the palms of the hands on the neck.

== See also ==
- Garbha Pindasana - the same limb positions as Uttana Kurmasana, but with the body upright, balancing
- List of asanas

== Sources ==
- Gray, Alexandra (2008). The Yoga Teacher. Grove Press. ISBN 978-0-8021-7055-2.
- Iyengar, B. K. S. (1979) [1966]. Light on Yoga: Yoga Dipika. Thorsons. ISBN 978-1855381667.
- Ramaswami, Srivatsa; Krishnamacharya, T. (2005). The Complete book of Vinyasa Yoga: An authoritative presentation, based on 30 years of direct study under the legendary yoga teacher Krishnamacharya. Da Capo Press. ISBN 978-1-56924-402-9.
- Saraswati, Swami Satyananda (1996) [1969]. Asana Pranayama Mudra Bandha (Third revised ed.). Munger, Bihar, India: Yoga Publications Trust. ISBN 81-86336-14-1.
- Sjoman, Norman E. (1999) [1996]. The Yoga Tradition of the Mysore Palace (2nd ed.). Abhinav Publications. ISBN 81-7017-389-2.
