= Parshvottanasana =

Standing yoga pose

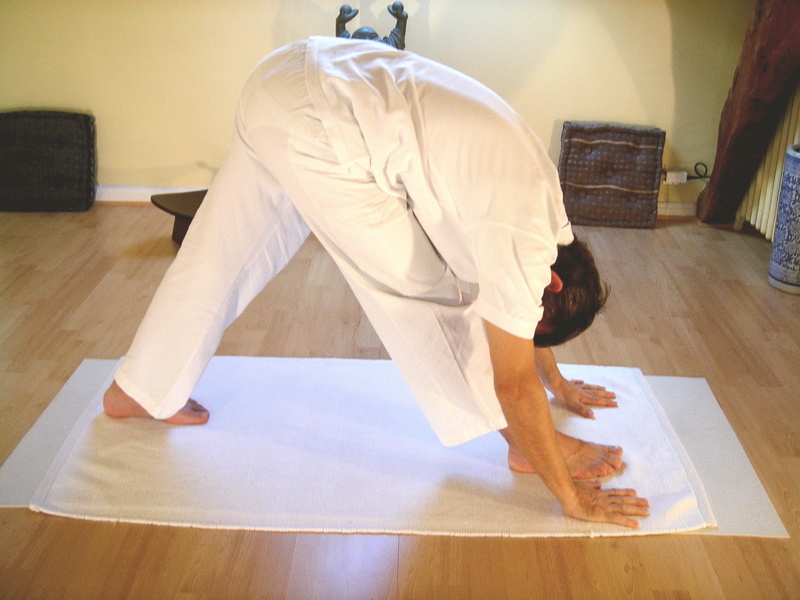
Parshvottanasana variant with hands brought to the floor

Parshvottanasana (Sanskrit: पार्श्वोत्तानासना, IAST: Pārśvottānāsana) or Intense Side Stretch Pose is a standing and forward bending asana in modern yoga as exercise.

== Etymology and origins ==
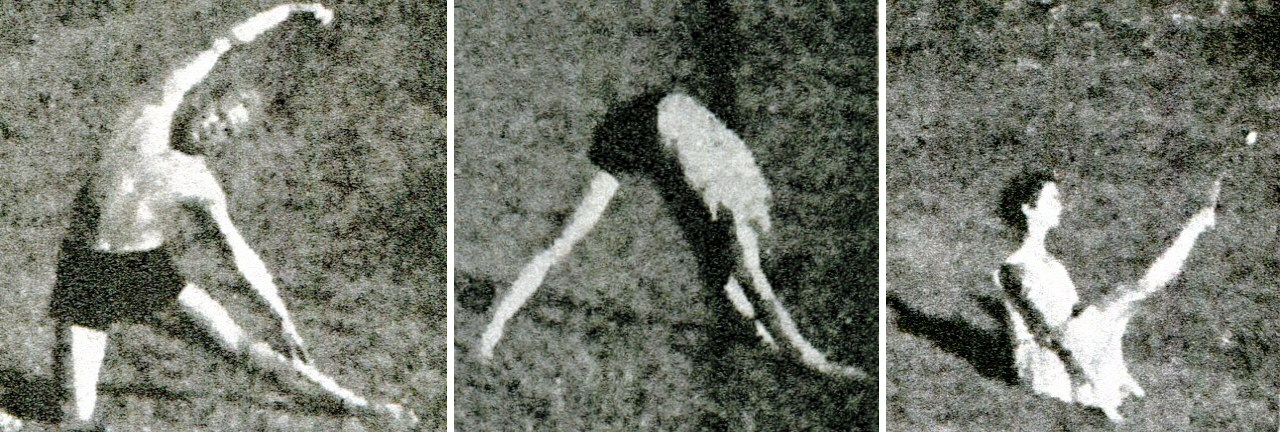
Postures in Niels Bukh's 1924 Primary Gymnastics resembling Parighasana, Parsvottanasana, and Navasana, supporting the suggestion that Krishnamacharya derived some of his asanas from the gymnastics culture of his time

The name of the pose is from the Sanskrit पार्श्व (parshva) meaning "side", ुत (ut) meaning "intense", तन (tan) meaning "to extend", and आसन (asana), meaning "seat" or "pose".

The pose is unknown in medieval hatha yoga, but is described in Krishnamacharya's 1935 Yoga Makaranda, and taken up by his pupils Pattabhi Jois and B. K. S. Iyengar in their respective schools of yoga. A similar pose appears in Niels Bukh's 1924 Primary Gymnastics; Mark Singleton suggests that Krishnamacharya, influenced by the general gymnastics culture of the time, adopted gymnastics poses into his flowing style of yoga.

== Description ==
The pose is entered from Tadasana. The hands are pressed palms together in prayer position behind the back, fingertips upwards. The feet are placed about a leg length apart, both legs remaining straight. The forward foot points directly forwards; the rear foot is turned forwards some 60 degrees. The hips are aligned at right angles to the feet, so that the body can move downwards in a forward bend straight over the front leg. The hands may be taken to the floor to intensify the stretch.

== Sources ==
- Iyengar, B. K. S. (1979) [1966]. Light on Yoga: Yoga Dipika. Unwin Paperbacks.
- Mehta, Silva; Mehta, Mira; Mehta, Shyam (1990). Yoga: The Iyengar Way. Dorling Kindersley.
- Mittra, Dharma (2003). Asanas: 608 Yoga Poses. New World Library. ISBN 978-1-57731-402-8.
- Rhodes, Darren (2016). Yoga Resource Practice Manual. Tirtha Studios. ISBN 978-0983688396.
