= Parighasana =

Kneeling asana

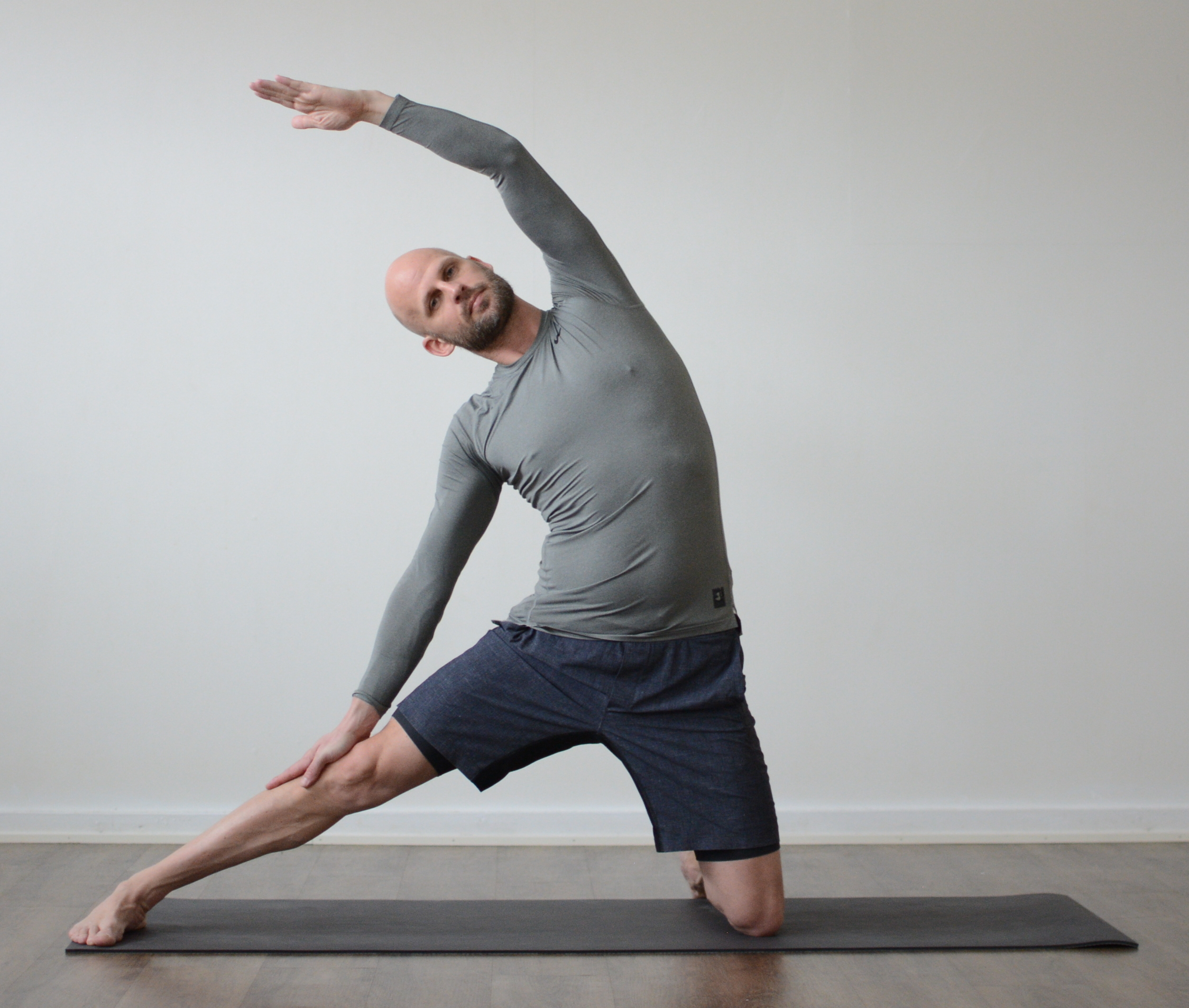
Parighasana

Parighasana or Gate Pose is a kneeling asana in modern yoga as exercise.

== Etymology and origins ==
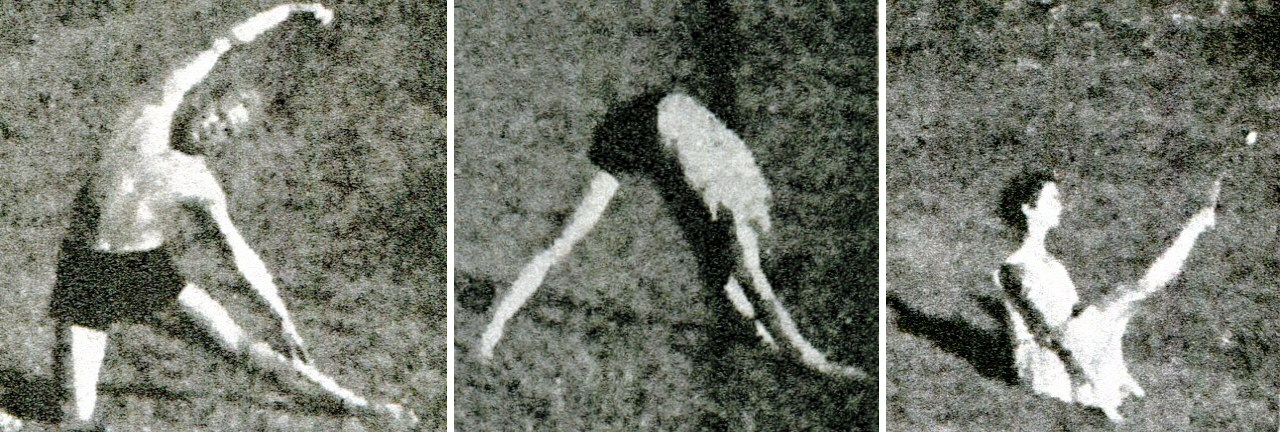
Postures in Niels Bukh's 1924 Primary Gymnastics resembling Parighasana, Parsvottanasana, and Navasana, supporting the suggestion that Krishnamacharya derived some of his asanas from the gymnastics culture of his time

The name of the pose is from the Sanskrit परिघासन Parighāsana, in turn from परिघ parigha, meaning "gate" or "crossbar", and आस āsana, meaning "seat" or "pose".

The asana is not known before the 20th century. Since, as yoga scholar Mark Singleton writes, it closely resembles a pose used in modern gymnastics, such as Niels Bukh's 1924 Primary Gymnastics, it is likely that Krishnamacharya derived the asana from the general gymnastics culture of his time; there is no suggestion that he copied it directly from Bukh.

== Description ==
The pose is entered from an upright kneeling position. One leg is stretched straight out to the side, the arms are stretched out sideways, and the body is extended to the side of the outstretched leg until the arm lies along the leg. The other arm may be stretched up alongside the head, and the hand may eventually lie on top of the other hand and foot.

== Variations ==
Beginners may work in the pose with the ball of the foot of the straight leg supported on a folded blanket or sandbag, or by pressing the foot against a wall.

Practitioners with a knee injury may work in the pose sitting on a chair, with one leg stretched out to the side.

== Sources ==
- Bukh, Niels (2010) [1924]. Primary Gymnastics. Tufts Press. ISBN 978-1446527351.
- Iyengar, B. K. S. (1979) [1966]. Light on Yoga: Yoga Dipika. Unwin Paperbacks.
- Mehta, Silva; Mehta, Mira; Mehta, Shyam (1990). Yoga: The Iyengar Way. Dorling Kindersley.
- Mittra, Dharma (2003). Asanas: 608 Yoga Poses. ISBN 978-1-57731-402-8.
- Rhodes, Darren (2016). Yoga Resource Practice Manual. Tirtha Studios. ISBN 978-0983688396.
- Singleton, Mark (2010). Yoga Body: The Origins of Modern Posture Practice. Oxford University Press. ISBN 978-0-19-539534-1.
