= Full boat =

Full boat may refer to:

- Full house (poker), a type of poker hand
- A variation of Navasana, a yoga asana
