= Kraunchasana =

Seated posture in modern yoga

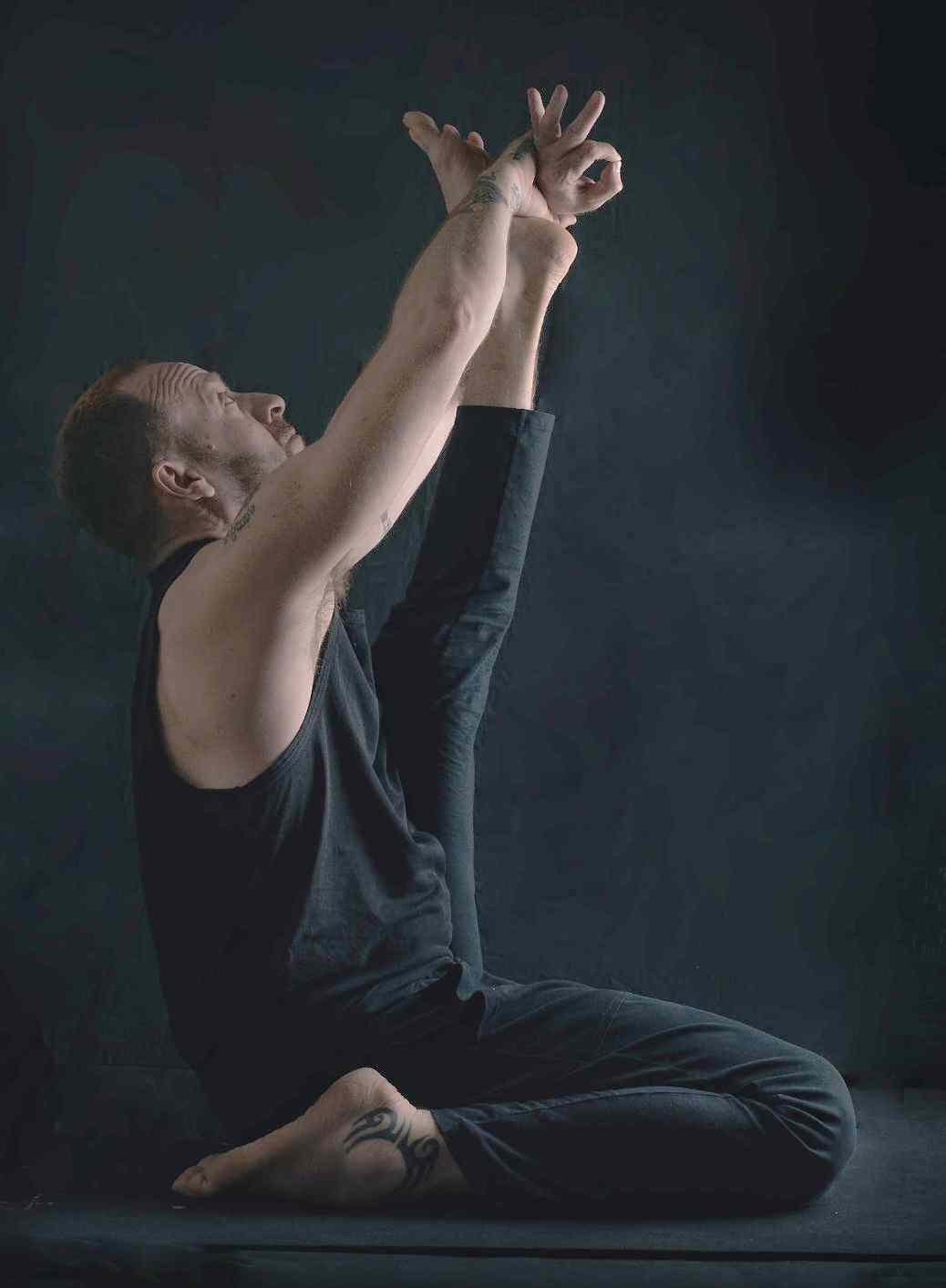
Krounchasana, Heron pose (with hands in a mudra)

Krauñcāsana (Sanskrit: क्रौञ्चासन) or Heron pose, also written Krounchasana, is a sitting asana in modern yoga as exercise.

== Etymology and origins ==
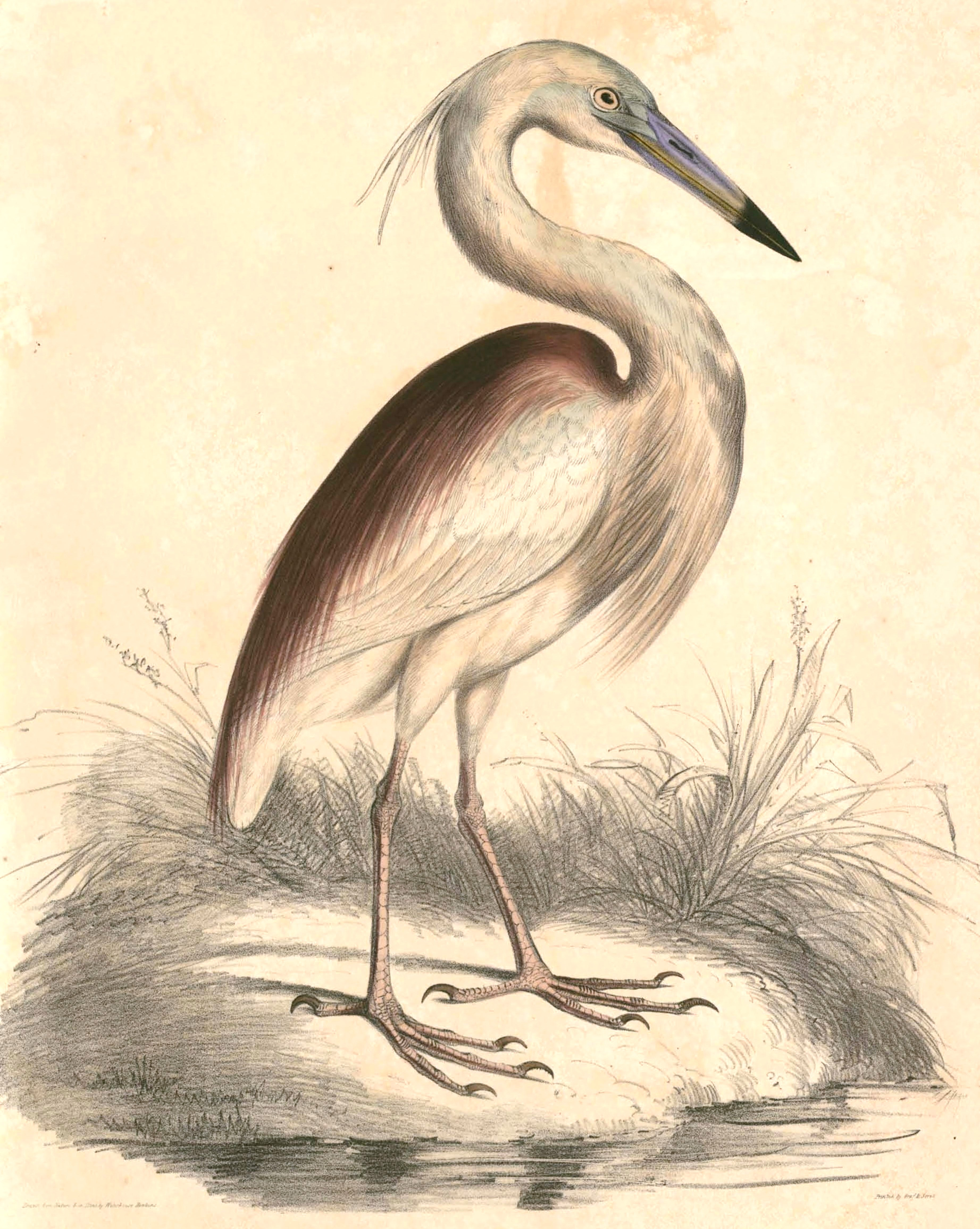
The pose is named for a long-legged waterbird, like the Indian pond heron.

The name comes from the Sanskrit words Kraunch (क्रौञ्च) meaning "heron", and the name of a mountain; and Asana (आसन, āsana) meaning "posture" or "seat". Kraunch can also mean the demoiselle crane or the curlew; both like the heron are long-legged waterbirds.

The 19th century Sritattvanidhi uses the name for a different pose, squatting, supported by a rope held with the teeth. The modern pose is described in 20th century manuals such as B. K. S. Iyengar's Light on Yoga. Swami Yogesvarananda names the modern pose "Ekapadotthitahastapadaprasaranasana" in his 1970 First Steps to Higher yoga, reserving the name Kraunchasana for a preparatory phase of another pose named for a waterbird, Bakasana (the Crane). Pattabhi Jois uses the name for the same pose as Iyengar, implying, according to the yoga scholar Norman Sjoman, that they both learnt the pose from their teacher Krishnamacharya.

== Description ==
The pose is accomplished by sitting with one knee forwards on the ground and the foot beside the hip, as in Virasana. The other leg is straight and raised to touch the nose and chin; the foot is grasped by both hands. This provides a stronger forward bend than Paschimottanasana. The posture is stated to be unsuitable during menstruation.

== Variations ==
A strap may be held in the hands and looped behind the sole of the foot of the extended leg, to allow the chest to continue lifting while the leg is straightened.
