= Edward Vilga =

American writer (born 1963)

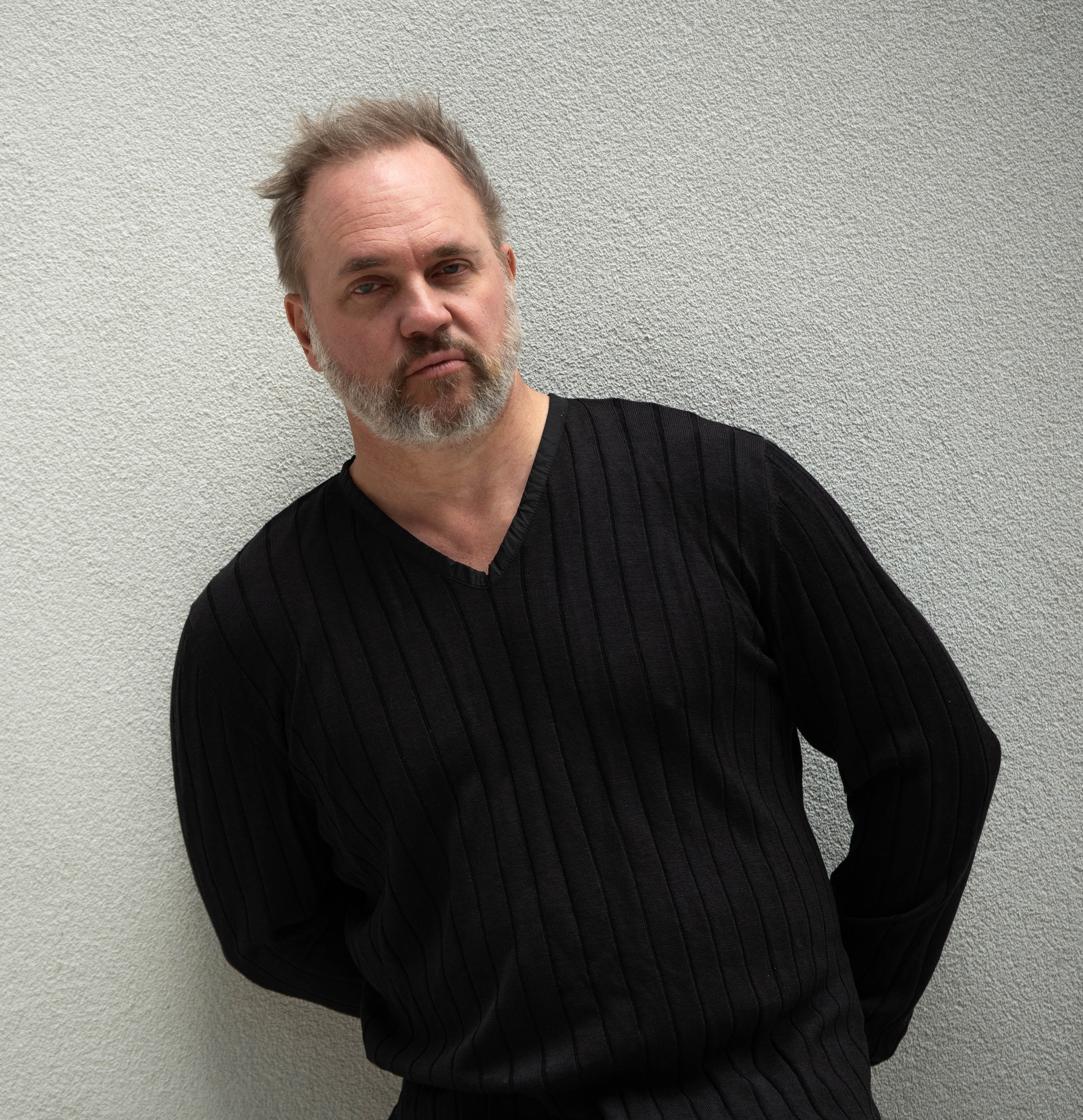
- Vilga in 2019
- Born: 1963 (age 62–63); Manchester, Connecticut, U.S.
- Occupations: Writer, yoga teacher, author, film director
- Writing career
- Years active: 1995–present

Edward Vilga (born 1963) is an American writer, yoga teacher, author and director. His work explores the themes of transformation, spirituality, wealth, and forgiveness.

Vilga holds a degree in English Literature from Yale University.

== Career ==
After graduating from Yale, Vilga began working in film production, initially with documentary filmmaker Helen C. Whitney. Worked as an associate producer of "Tilt 23 1/2", which was an international television news magazine produced by Fujisankei Communications that aired in 72 countries.

Vilga produced several Off-Broadway productions with Watermark Theater, including Susan Miller's Obie Award-winning play My Left Breast. He then began writing, directing and producing his projects in a variety of media.

Vilga is the author of Yoga in Bed (Running Press; 2005) and Yoga for Suits (Running Press; 2006), which have been translated into several languages. The books and DVDs have been featured in People Magazine, Oprah’s O Magazine, and Live with Kelly!

He wrote Acting Now: Conversations on Craft and Career (Rutgers University Press, 1997), a collection of interviews.

Vilga's novel Downward Dog was released in paperback by Diversion Books in June 2014. The novel incorporates yoga poses (asanas) and tells the story of a man who decides to become a private yoga teacher in New York City.

His book The Yoga of Money Manifesto was released by Stone Heap Publishing in March 2017.

"Miracle in Rwanda", a play Vilga directed and co-created with performer Leslie Lewis, has toured internationally with over 150 performances. It received positive reviews from the Village Voice and Broadway Baby. “Miracle in Rwanda” had a six-week Off-Broadway run in 2019 and was featured at the United Nations in a special performance for the 25th Commemoration of the 1994 genocide against the Tutsi in Rwanda.

Vilga wrote and directed the feature film Dead Broke (Warner Brothers DVD, 2006). On May 3, 1999, in a joint venture with the TriBeCa Film Center, Microsoft and iFilm, it became the first film to debut simultaneously on the internet and the big screen.

Vilga associate produced the independent film “With Child” (Summer Hill Films, 2014), which was nominated for Best World Showcase at the Soho Film Festival.

== Works ==
=== Books ===
- The Yoga of Money Manifesto (2017) Stone Heap Publishing. ISBN 978-0-6928-6894-2
- Downward Dog (2014) Diversion Books. ISBN 978-1-6268-1323-6
- Upward Dog (2010) CreateSpace Independent Publishing. ISBN 978-1456344436
- Yoga for Suits (2006) Running Press. ISBN 978-0-7624-2621-8
- Yoga in Bed (2005) Running Press. ISBN 978-0-7624-2341-5
- Acting Now: Conversations on Craft and Career (1997) Rutgers University Press. ISBN 978-0-8135-2403-0

=== Theater ===
Year	Title	Venue	Ref
2019	Miracle in Rwanda	Lion Theatre, New York	

=== Film ===
Year	Title	Studio	Ref
2006	Dead Broke	Warner Bros.	
