= Utthita Parshvakonasana =

Standing posture in modern yoga

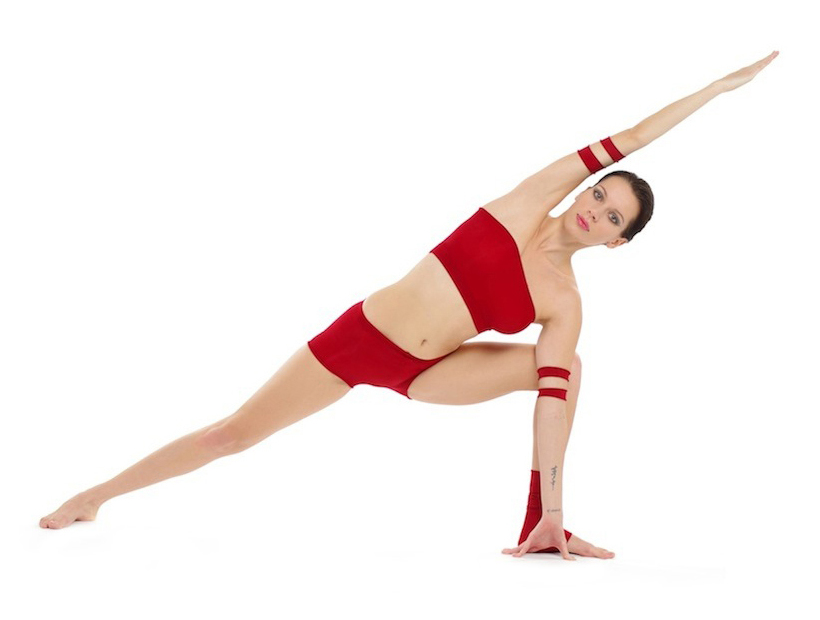
Utthita Parshvakonasana variant with arm in front of leg

Utthita Parshvakonasana (Sanskrit: उत्थित पार्श्वकोणासन; IAST: utthita pārśvakoṇāsana), Extended Side Angle Pose, is an asana in modern yoga as exercise. It is first described in 20th century texts.

== Etymology and origins ==
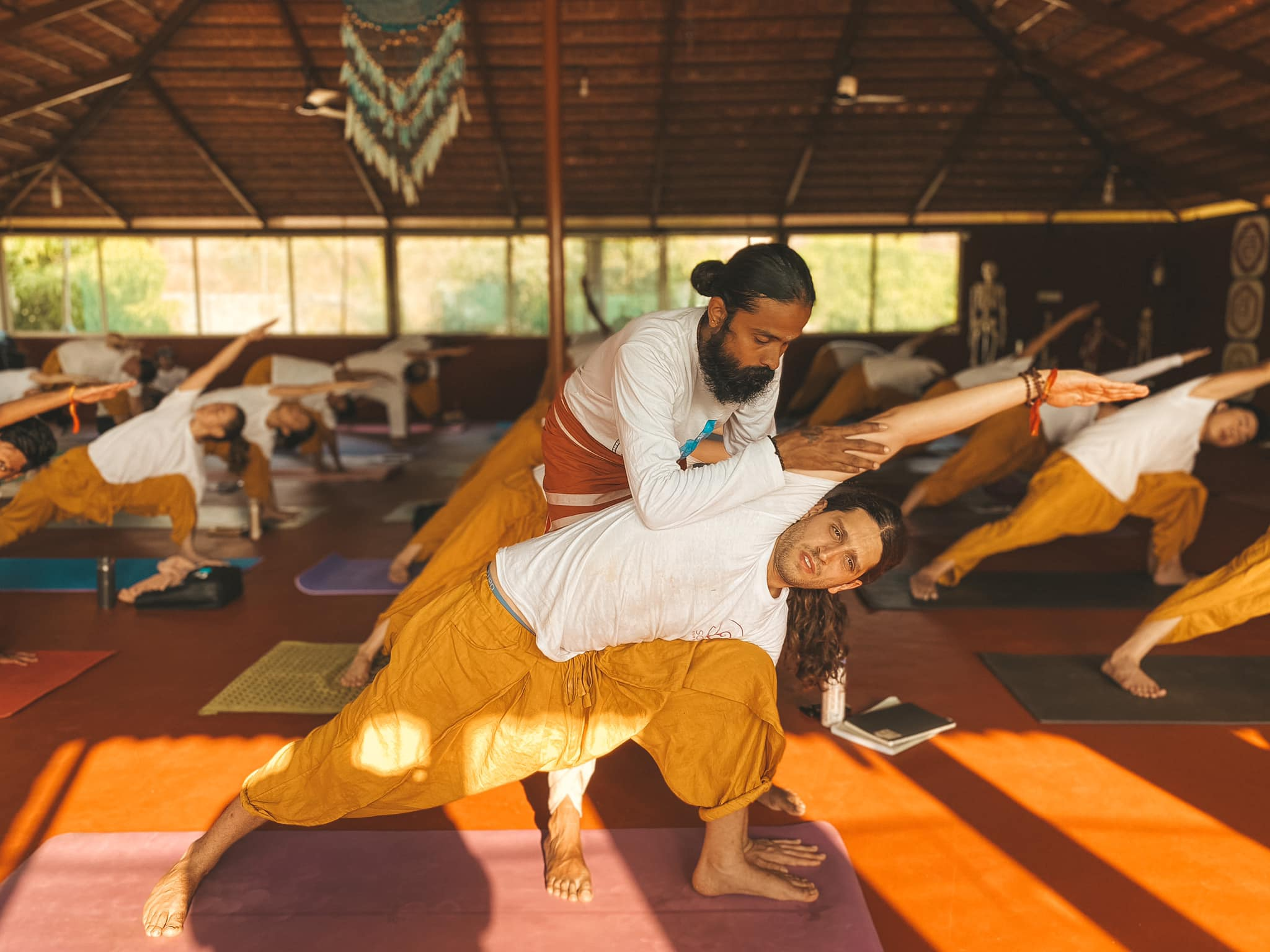
Yoga class in India

The name comes from the Sanskrit words utthita meaning "extended", parsva meaning "side or flank", kona meaning "angle", and asana meaning "posture or seat".

The pose is not mentioned in medieval hatha yoga texts. It appears in the 20th century in Krishnamacharya's school of yoga in Mysore, and in the teaching of his pupils Pattabhi Jois and B. K. S. Iyengar, along with other asanas with names that describe the position of the body and its limbs.

== Description ==
The pose is entered from Tadasana; the legs are spread wide apart, the feet are turned out as for Trikonasana and the arms are stretched out sideways. One knee is bent to a right angle and the hand on that side is placed on the floor just behind the foot. The upper arm is then stretched in line with the body straight out, above the ear.

== Variations ==
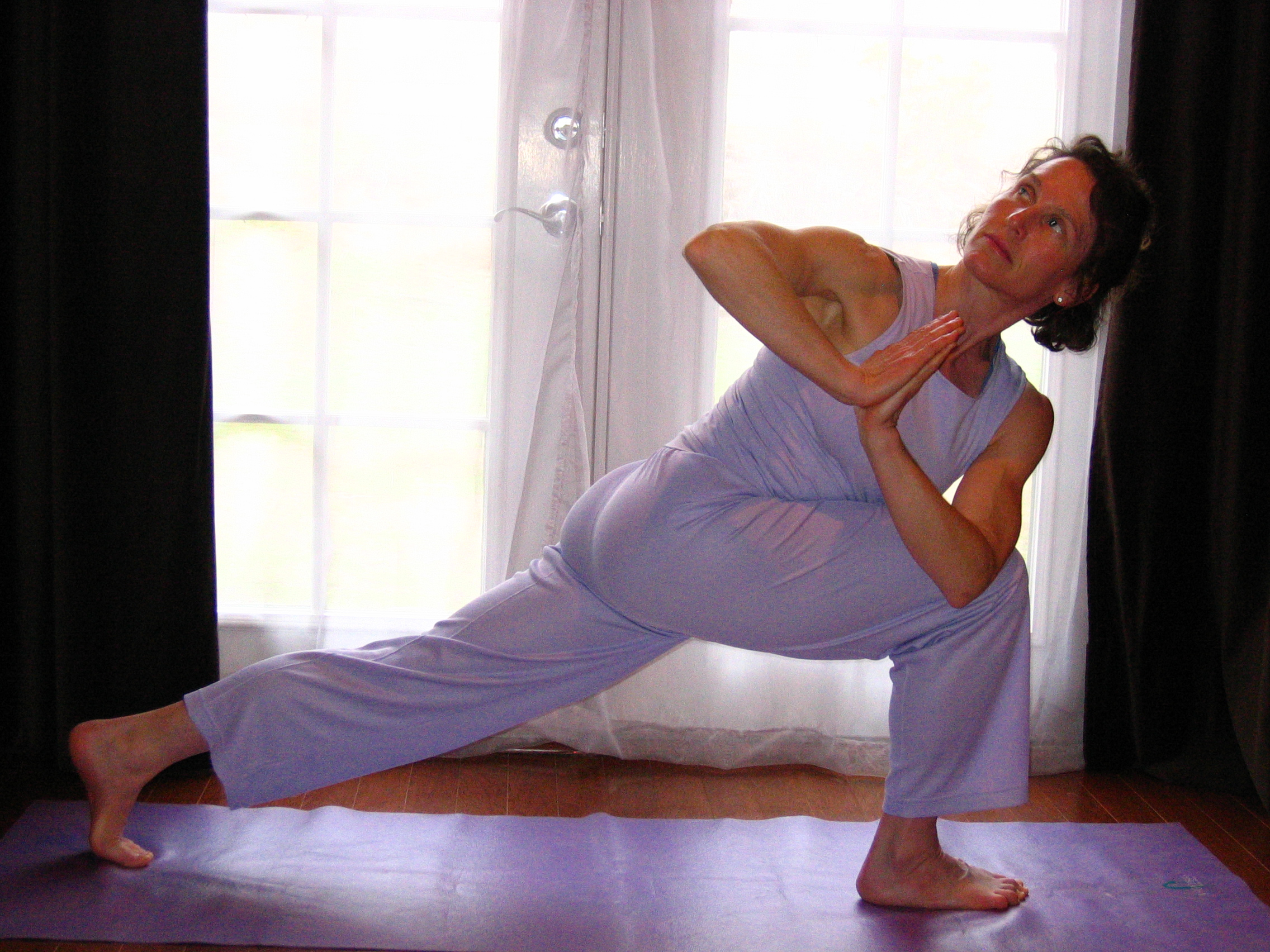
Parivritta Parshvakonasana

A twisting asana, Parivritta Parshvakonasana (reversed side angle pose), is obtained by reversing the direction of turn of the thorax. The opposite elbow is brought to the forward knee; this is a useful preparatory pose. In the full pose, the hand is brought to the floor on the outside of the front foot, and the other hand is stretched forwards in line with the body over the head, with the gaze directed upwards.

== Sources ==
- Iyengar, B. K. S. (1979) [1966]. Light on Yoga: Yoga Dipika. Unwin Paperbacks.
- Mehta, Silva; Mehta, Mira; Mehta, Shyam (1990). Yoga: The Iyengar Way. Dorling Kindersley.
- Singleton, Mark (2010). Yoga body : the origins of modern posture practice. Oxford University Press. ISBN 978-0-19-539534-1. OCLC 318191988.
- Sjoman, Norman E. (1999) [1996]. The Yoga Tradition of the Mysore Palace. Abhinav Publications. ISBN 81-7017-389-2.
