= Anantasana =

Reclining posture in modern yoga

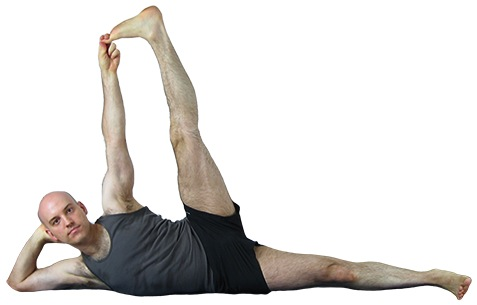
Anantasana

Anantasana (Sanskrit: अनन्तासन; IAST: IAST: Anantāsana), Sleeping Vishnu Pose or Vishnu's Couch Pose, Eternal One's Pose, or Side-Reclining Leg Lift is an asana in modern yoga as exercise.

== Etymology and origins ==
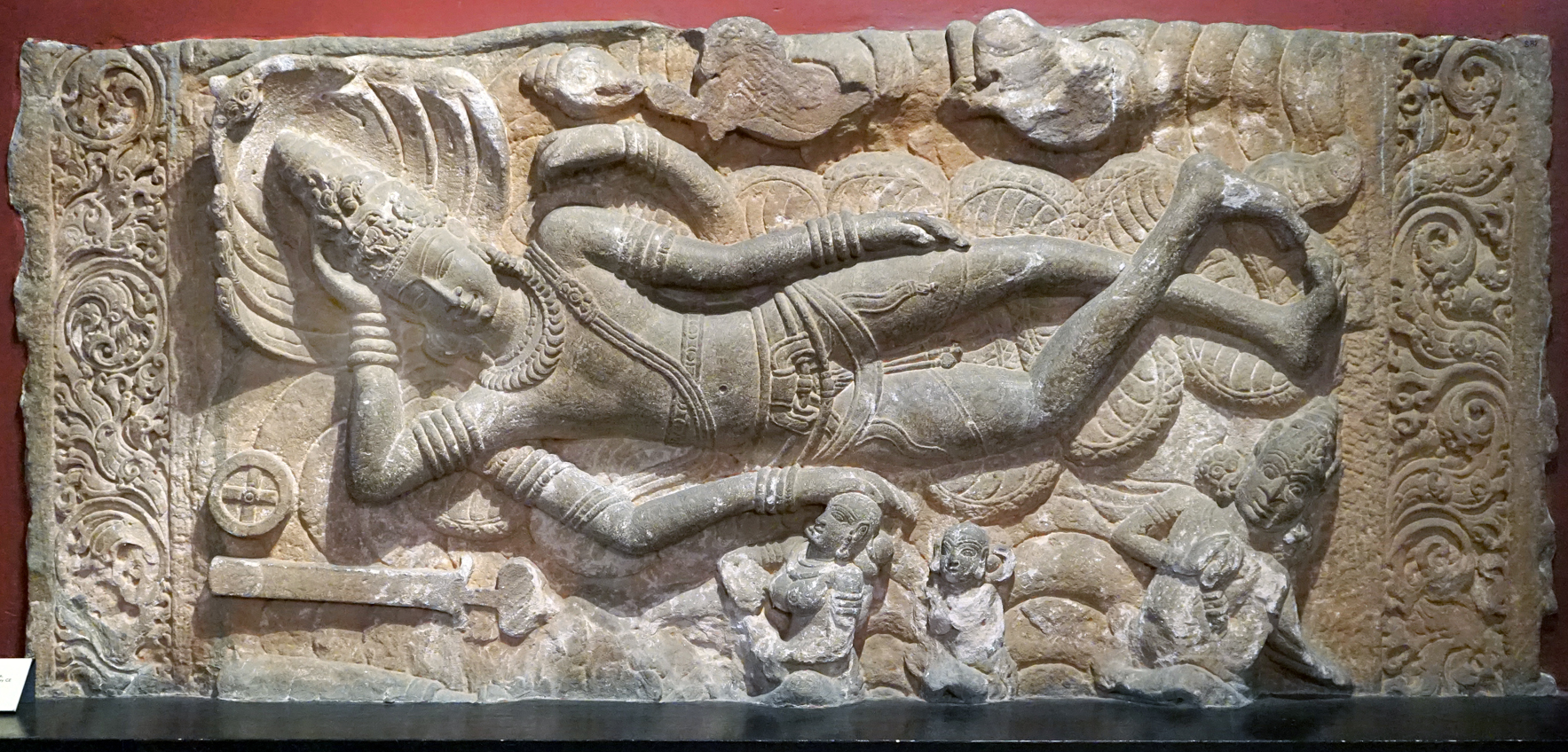
Relief statue of Vishnu sleeping on the many coils of the infinite serpent. From Huchchappaiyya Gudi Temple, Aihole, Bagalkot, Karnataka, 7th century.

The name comes from the Sanskrit words anantā (अनन्त) meaning "without end" or "the infinite one", for the thousand-headed serpent Shesha upon which Vishnu rested at the bottom of the primordial ocean, and āsana (आसन) meaning "posture" or "seat".

A different reclining pose named Anantasana is described and illustrated in the 19th century Sritattvanidhi. The modern pose is described in the 1966 Light on Yoga.

== Description ==
Anantasana is entered from a lying position. The head is supported with one hand, the upper arm on the ground on that side; the other hand and leg are stretched straight up, the fingers grasping the big toe of the raised foot. The supporting arm, body, and lower leg are in a straight line.

== In culture ==
ON 26 December 2024, Chethan Kulkarni held Anantasana for a record duration of 30 minutes.
