= Prayatna =

Sanskrit term meaning effort or exertion

Prayatna (Sanskrit: प्रयत्न) is a Sanskrit term meaning "effort", "exertion", "endeavour", or "striving". The word refers to the act of applying effort toward an action or goal and is used in linguistic, philosophical, and general contexts in classical Sanskrit literature.

== Etymology ==
The word prayatna derives from the Sanskrit verbal root yat (यत्), meaning "to strive", "to attempt", or "to exert oneself". The prefix pra- intensifies the meaning, giving the sense of deliberate or directed effort.

== Meaning ==
In Sanskrit dictionaries, prayatna is defined as effort, exertion, endeavour, or purposeful activity.

The term generally refers to the conscious application of effort in performing an action or pursuing an objective. In many classical texts, it conveys the idea of determination, initiative, and active striving.

== See also ==
- Sanskrit grammar
- Sanskrit phonology
