= Dharma Mittra =

Brazilian yogi

Sri Dharma Mittra
- Born: May 14, 1939 (age 87); Pirapora, Minas Gerais, Brazil
- Occupation: Yoga teacher
- Known for: Master Yoga Chart of 908 Postures

Dharma Mittra is a guru of modern yoga and a student of Swami Kailashananda.

Mittra's 1984 "Master Yoga Chart of 908 Postures", his best-known work

Mittra is known for his Master Yoga Chart of 908 Postures, each asana illustrated with a photograph of Mittra performing the pose. He has been teaching since 1967, and is director of the Dharma Yoga Center in New York City which he founded in 1975.

== Life ==
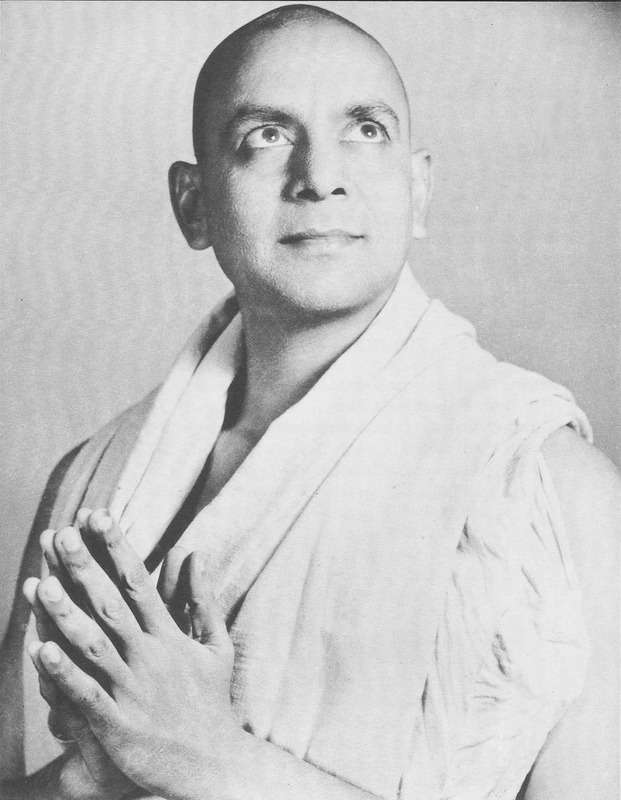
Mittra's guru, Swami Kailashananda

Dharma Mittra was born on May 14, 1939, in Pirapora, Minas Gerais, Brazil. He started studying Yoga in 1958. In 1964, he left the Brazilian Air Force and moved to New York City, to study under his new guru, Swami Kailashananda, known in America as Yogi Gupta. After intensive study of Ashtanga and Karma Yoga, in 1966 he was accepted and initiated as a sannyasi (one who renounces the world in order to realize God). Dharma began teaching in 1967, after spending a decade as a full-time yogi and brahmachari (a celibate religious student who lives with his teacher and devotes himself to the practice of spiritual disciplines). A celebrated teacher at his guru's ashram, he left in 1975 and founded the Dharma Yoga Center in New York City. He is director of the Dharma Yoga Center in New York City.

Dharma Mittra completed the Master Yoga Chart of 908 Postures in 1984, after having photographed himself in 1300 Yoga postures, then cut and pasted the pictures to create the work; by 2003, it had sold over 50,000 copies.

== Works ==
- 1984 Master Yoga Chart of 908 Postures (poster)
- 2003 Asanas: 608 Yoga Poses. New World Library. (book)
- 2006 Maha Sadhana: The Great Practice. (instructional videos on two DVDs)
  - Level 1: A Shortcut to Immortality. ASIN 0976383675.
  - Level 2: Stairway to Bliss. ASIN B001GXMU80.

== See also ==
- Darren Rhodes, another yogi widely known through a poster showing him demonstrating many asanas
