= Niels Bukh =

Danish gymnast and educator (1880–1950)

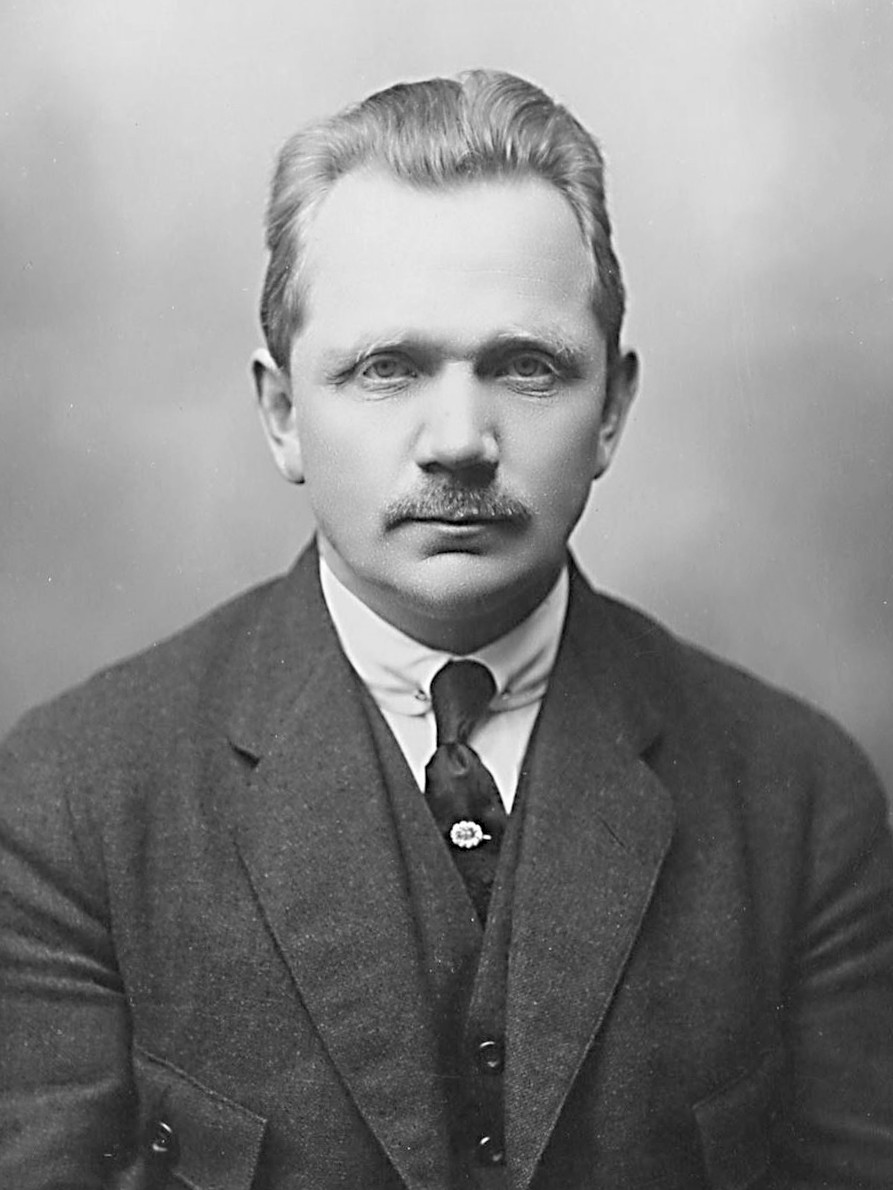
Niels Bukh

Niels Ebbesen Mortensen Bukh (15 June 1880 – 7 July 1950) was a Danish gymnast and educator who founded the first athletic folk high school in Ollerup in Funen, Denmark. He achieved international fame as a gymnastics trainer for the Danish team at the Olympic Games in Stockholm in 1912. He was inspired by the rhythmic female gymnastics of the Finnish gymnastics educator Elli Björkstén(1870–1947) and the medical gymnastics of Kaare Theilmann.

== Primary Gymnastics ==
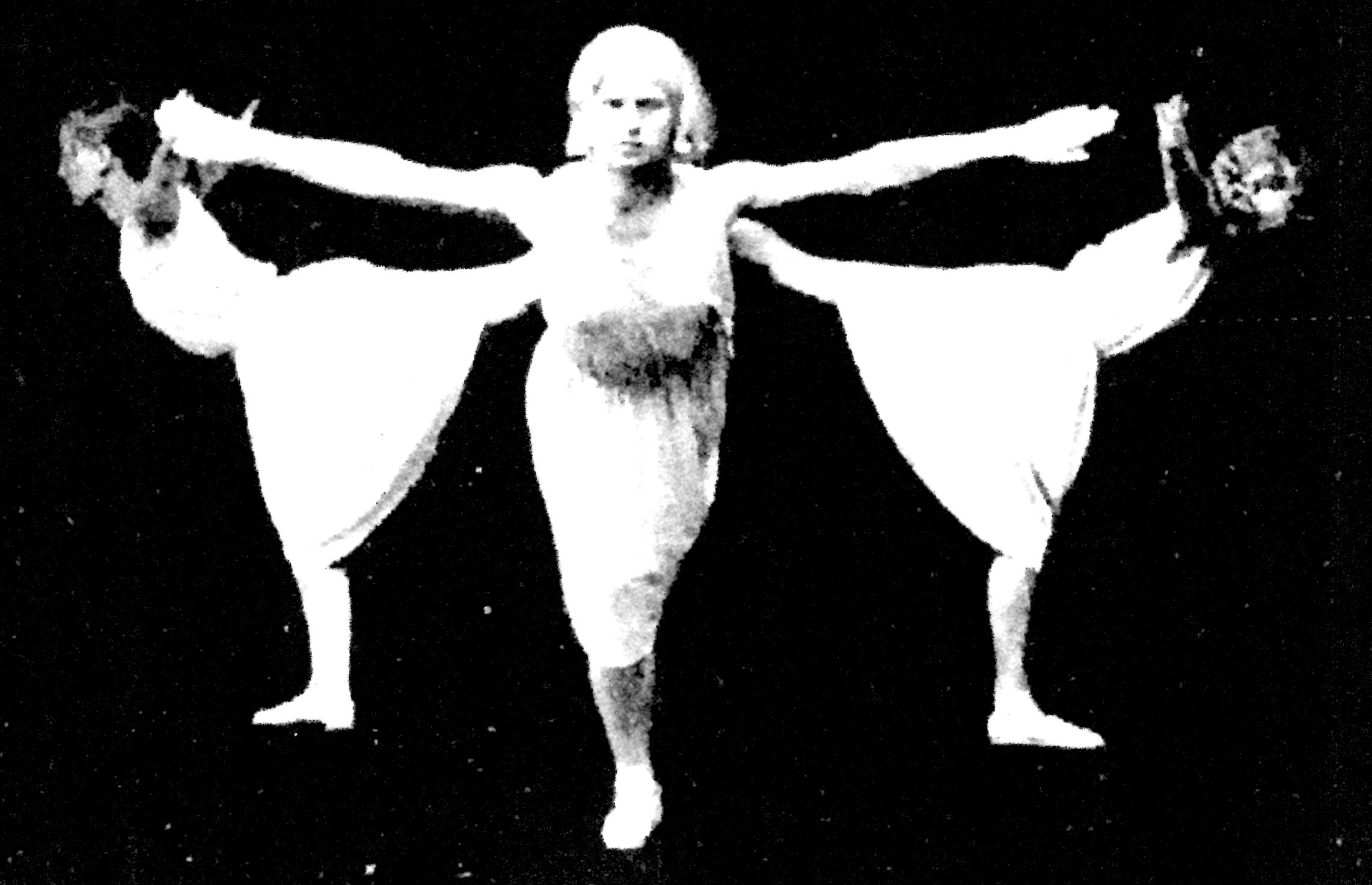
Pose in Bukh's Primary Gymnastics, 1924

Within the tradition of Pehr Henrik Ling, Bukh developed his own primitive gymnastics, aimed at using forceful exercises to prevent stiffness and bad bodily habits. His 1924 book "Grundgymnastik eller primitiv gymnastik" (known in English as Primary Gymnastics or Primitive Gymnastics) was a how-to manual about his method, which was later adopted by organizations such as the YMCA. The yoga scholar Mark Singleton has argued that through the YMCA and their gymnastics training in British India, Bukh's exercises influenced Tirumalai Krishnamacharya's style of asanas in modern yoga as exercise. In 1931 his gymnastics team toured the world, visiting Canada, Japan, Korea, the Soviet Union, and the United States, and he became famous.

== National Socialism and homosexuality ==
His system of exercise became highly popular in Germany, and in 1933 Bukh publicly expressed his allegiance to the National Socialist cause and its aim of improving the health of the Aryan race through gymnastics. This made Bukh unpopular in Denmark, especially after the German occupation of Denmark in 1940. Bukh's support for Nazism caused a backlash when a previous lover publicly revealed Bukh's homosexuality. Bukh had lived together with a male partner for several years, and his sexuality was well known in his family and among his friends and students. Biographers speculate that Bukh never became aware of the Nazi stance against homosexuality, even with his frequent visits to Germany during the 1930s and 1940s.

== Manor house ==
In 1944 he bought Løgismose manor; he sold it in 1947.

== See also ==
- Physical culture
