= Navasana =

Sitting balancing yoga asana

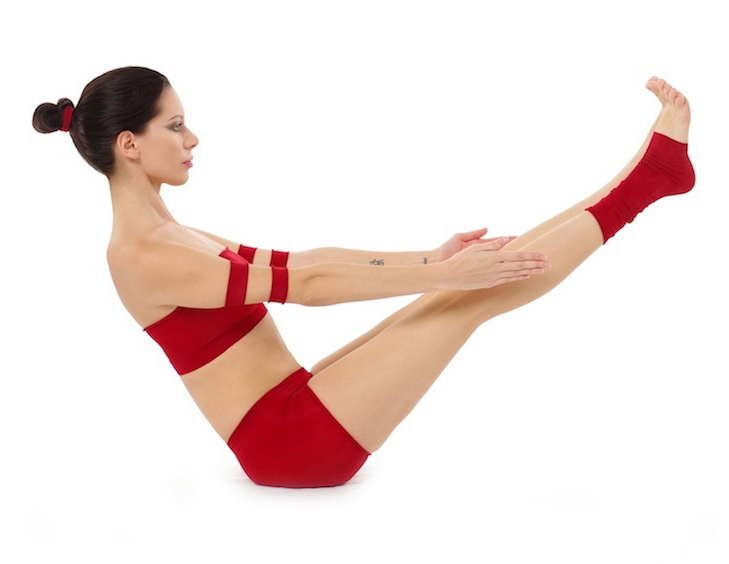
Paripurna Navasana

Navasana (Sanskrit: नावासन; IAST: nāvāsana), Naukasana, Boat Pose, or Paripurna Navasana (Sanskrit: परिपूर्णनावासन; IAST: paripūrṇanāvāsana "Full Boat Pose") is a seated asana in modern yoga as exercise.

== Etymology and origins ==
The name comes from the Sanskrit words परिपूर्ण paripurna meaning "full", नाव nava meaning "boat" and आसन asana meaning "posture" or "seat".

The pose was illustrated in the 19th century Sritattvanidhi under the name Naukāsana, also meaning boat pose.

== Description ==
To enter the pose from sitting, the knees are bent, and the body's weight is shifted back until the soles of the feet lift off the ground. In the pose, the body is balanced on the sitting bones, not leaning right back on to the tailbone. The spine is lengthened to broaden and lift the chest.

Preparatory poses for Navasana include the standing poses Utkatasana and Uttanasana, and the seated pose Dandasana.

== Variations ==
Variations include the easier Ardha Navasana (Sanskrit: अर्धनावासन "Half Boat Pose") with feet and body only half-raised. The more difficult Ubhaya Padangusthasana has both hands grasping the toes or feet.

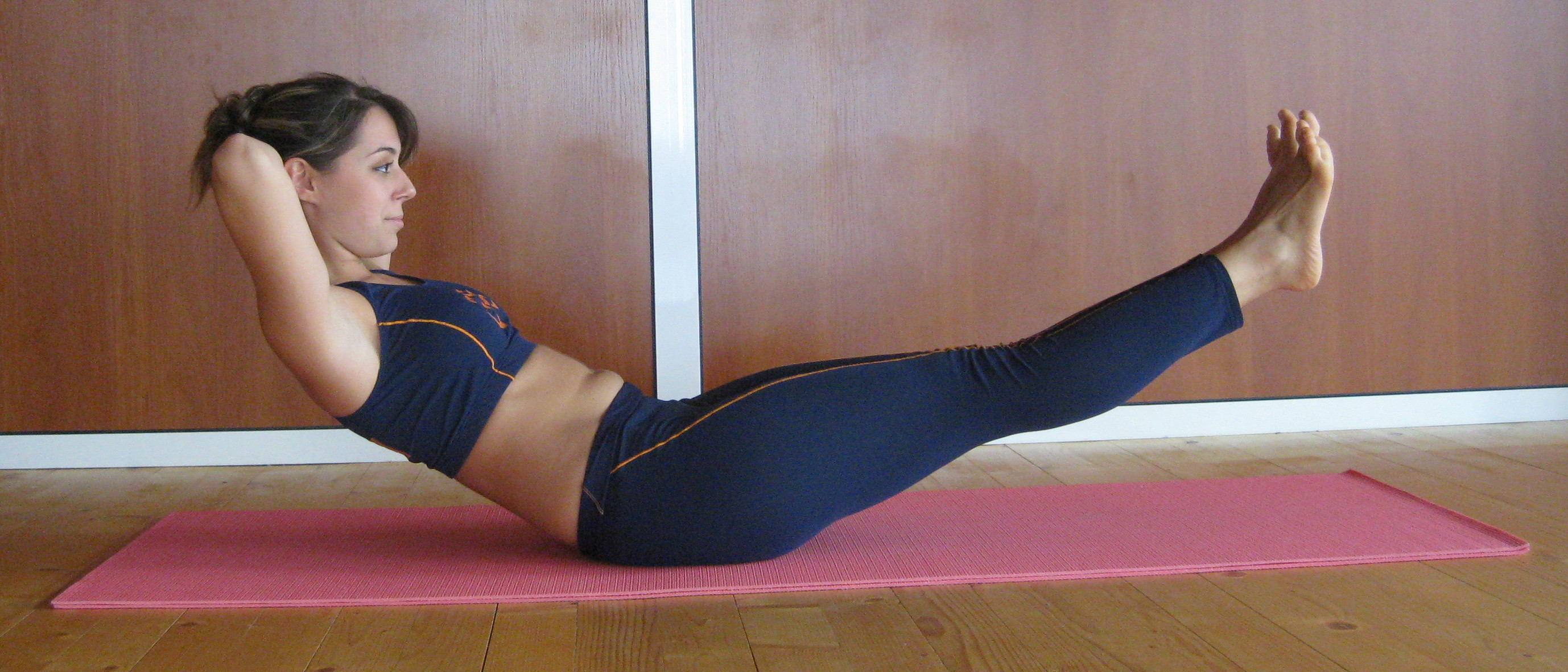
Ardha Navasana

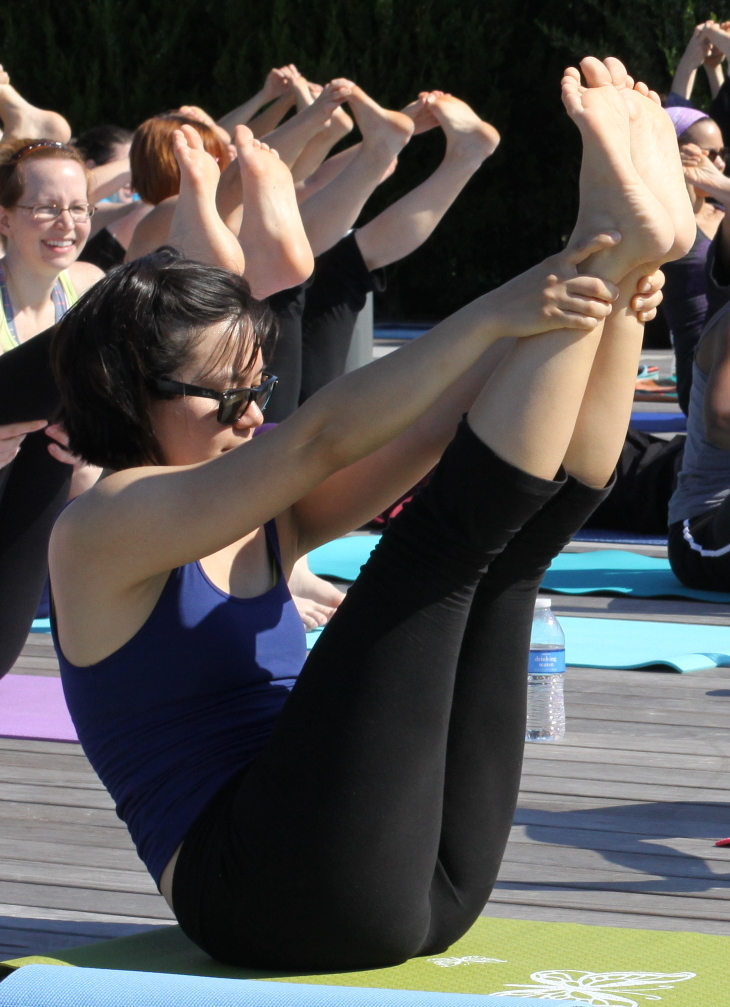
Ubhaya Padangusthasana,
holding toes or ankles

== Claimed benefits ==
It's said that, when practicing this asana upon waking, it immediately restores freshness.
