= Drishti (yoga) =

Focused gaze in yoga

Drishti (Sanskrit: दृष्टि, romanized: dṛṣṭi, pronounced [d̪r̩ʂʈɪ], "gazing intently") is the attachment of one's gaze to various focal points. It relates to the fifth limb of yoga, pratyahara, concerning sense withdrawal, as well as the sixth limb, dharana, relating to concentration. Also, they can help in balancing poses, making it easier to maintain balance in mind and body.

In Ashtanga Vinyasa Yoga, each asana is associated with one of 8 drishtis. In some other styles, such as Iyengar Yoga and Sivananda Yoga, less use is made of drishtis, and fewer types are employed.

== History ==
The ancient manuscript Yoga Korunta was said to contain original teachings on drishti, amongst other yoga concepts.

In the Bhagavad Gita VI.13, Krishna instructs the hero Arjuna to "hold one's body and head erect in a straight line and stare steadily at the tip of the nose".

The Yoga Sutras of Patanjali define eight limbs of yoga but do not mention the gaze. However, the fifth limb, pratyahara (sense withdrawal), requires withdrawing the senses, and the sixth limb, dharana (concentration), requires holding one's mind onto an inner state, subject or topic. The mind can for example be fixed on one's breath, a part of the body such as the navel or the tip of the nose or the tip of the tongue, external objects, a mantra or a drone. This is an internal concentration of attention, not a gaze.

The 1737 Joga Pradīpikā uses the same two drishtis, Nasagre (tip of nose) and Bhrumadhye (eyebrow), requiring their use with each of the 84 asanas described in the text.

== Modern ==
Styles of modern yoga as exercise such as Ashtanga (vinyasa) yoga, Iyengar Yoga and Sivananda yoga make differing uses of drishtis.

=== Ashtanga ===
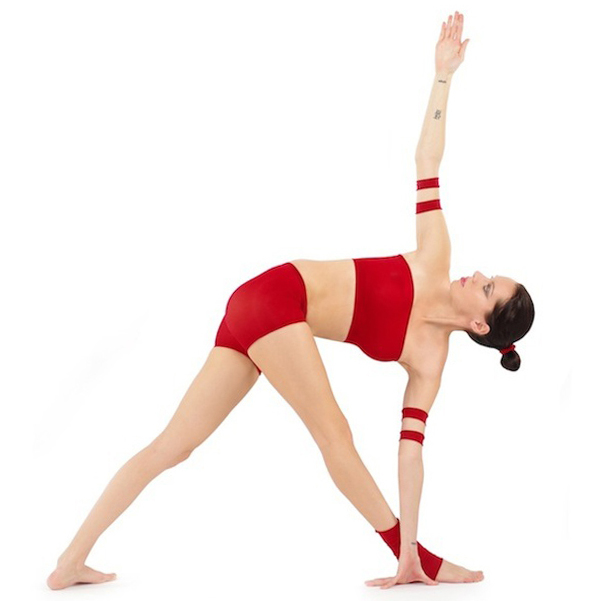
In Parivritta Trikonasana the gaze is directed to the tips of the fingers, Hastagrahe drishti.

Each asana is associated in Ashtanga yoga with a particular drishti. There are eight drishtis (counting the paired Parshva drishtis on the left and right sides as one).

Drishti	Sanskrit	Gaze at	Used in
Angushthamadhye	अङ्गूष्ठमध्ये	Thumb	Surya Namaskara A Vinyasa One (Urdhva Vrikshasana)
Bhrumadhye	भ्रूमध्ये	Center of the forehead (third eye)	Surya Namaskar uses it on the inhale following Uttanasana, during Urdhva Mukha Svanasana, and again on the inhale after Adho Mukha Svanasana.
Nasagre	नासाग्रे	Tip of nose	Many asanas, e.g. Surya Namaskara, Samasthitiḥ, Uttanasana and Chaturanga Dandasana; transition from Virabhadrasana A to Urdhva Mukha Svanasana
Hastagrahe	हसतग्रहे	Tips of fingers, or palm of hand	Utthita Trikonasana, Parivritta Trikonasana
Parshva	पार्श्व	Side (left or right)	Marichyasana C, and Marichyasana D
Urdhva	ऊर्घ्व	Upward	Surya Namaskara B Vinyasas; Utkatasana, Virabhadrasana A; Upavishta Konasana B, Ubhaya Padangushtasana and Urdhva Mukha Pashimottanasana.
Nabhicakre	नाभिचक्रे	Navel	Adho Mukha Shvanasana
Pādayoragre	पाडयोरग्रे	Toes	Utthita Hasta Padangushtasana, Paścimottānāsana sequence, Janu Sirsasana sequence, Marichyasana A, Navasana and Supta Padangushtasana.

=== Iyengar ===
Iyengar Yoga sometimes speaks of drishtis; in its instructions for some asanas it tells the practitioner to look in a certain direction, for example to gaze at the thumb for Trikonasana.

=== Sivananda ===
Sivananda Yoga makes use of two drishtis, namely Nāsāgre (tip of nose) and Bhrūmadhye (eyebrow), for tratak exercise (a purification), and also says 'focus the gaze' in asana practice. Vishnudevananda cautions that prolonged or incorrect practice may cause problems for the eye muscles or nervous system. Initial practice is often done for only minutes at a time, but is gradually increased to up to ten minute intervals.

== See also ==
- Vairagya
- Oculesics

== Sources ==
- Bell, Charlotte (2007). Mindful Yoga, Mindful Life: A Guide for Everyday Practice. Rodmell Press. ISBN 978-1930485204.
- Jha, Ganganath (trans.) (1907). The Yoga-darsana: The sutras of Patanjali with the Bhasya of Vyasa - Book 3 (Translator) [The Yoga-darsana: The sutras of Patanjali with the commentary of Vyasa - Book 3 (Translator)]. Rajaram Tukaram Tatya, for the Bombay Theosophical Publication Fund.
- Jois, K. Pattabhi (2010). Yoga Mala: The Seminal Treatise and Guide from the Living Master of Ashtanga Yoga (Kindle ed.). Macmillan. ISBN 978-0-86547-751-3.
- Life, David (6 April 2017) [28 August 2007]. "See More Clearly By Practicing Drishti". Yoga Journal.
- Maehle, Gregor (2011). Ashtanga Yoga Practice and Philosophy (Kindle ed.). New World Library. ISBN 978-1-57731-606-0.
- Maehle, Gregor (2006). Ashtanga Yoga Practice and Philosophy (First New World Library edition, September 2007 ed.). New World Library. ISBN 978-1-57731-606-0.
- Mallinson, James; Singleton, Mark (2017). Roots of Yoga. Penguin Books. ISBN 978-0-241-25304-5. OCLC 928480104.
- Mehta, Mira (1990). Yoga: The Iyengar Way. Dorling Kindersley. ISBN 978-0863184208.
- Monier-Williams, Monier (1999). A Sanskrit-English Dictionary: Etymologically and Philologically Arranged with special reference to cognate Indo-European languages. Digitized and Searchable. Oxford University Press (Print) and University of Cologne (Digitized). ISBN 978-8-12150-200-9.
- Vishnudevananda, Swami (2011). The Complete Illustrated Book of Yoga (Kindle ed.). Random House. ISBN 978-0-51788-431-7.
