= Cobra pose =

Reclining back-bending postures in hatha yoga and modern yoga

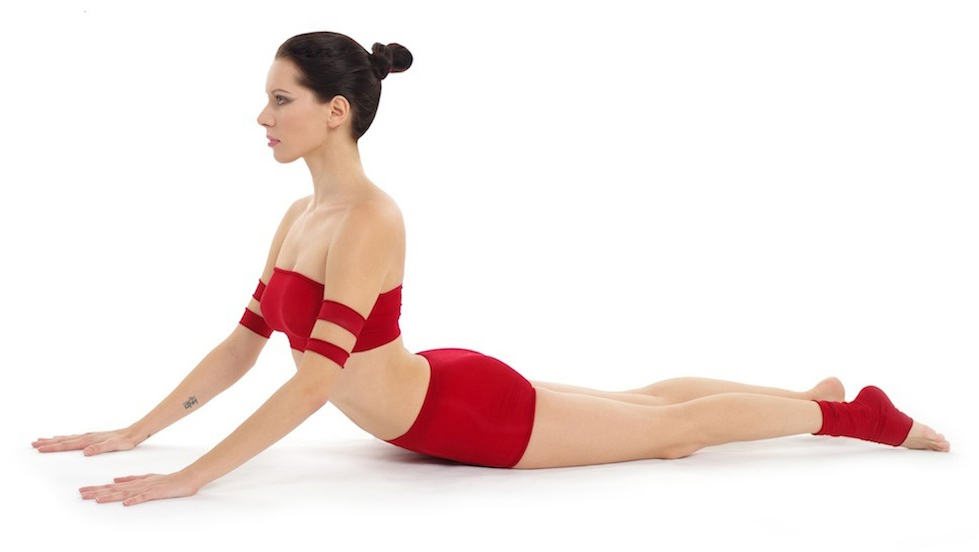
Cobra pose or Bhujangasana

Cobra Pose or Bhujangasana (Sanskrit: भुजङ्गासन; IAST: Bhujaṅgāsana) is a reclining back-bending asana in hatha yoga and modern yoga as exercise. It is also performed in some forms of the cycle of asanas in Surya Namaskar, Salute to the Sun, as an alternative to Urdhva Mukha Svanasana, Upward Dog Pose. The Yin Yoga form is Sphinx Pose.

== Etymology and origins ==
The name "Bhujangasana" comes from the Sanskrit words भुजङ्ग bhujaṅga, "snake" and आसन āsana, "posture" or "seat", from the resemblance to a snake with its head raised; it was described in the 17th century hatha yoga text Gheranda Samhita in chapter 2, verses 42–43. In the 19th century Sritattvanidhi, the pose is named सरपासन Sarpāsana, "Serpent Pose", from सरप, sarpa[m], "serpent" or "snake". The Hatha Yogi Narayana Ghamande described and illustrated the pose in halftone as Bhujangasana in the 1905 book Yogasopana Purvacatuska.

Urdhva Mukha Shvanasana (Sanskrit: ऊर्ध्वमुखश्वानासन IAST: Urdhva mukha śvānāsana) is from the Sanskrit ऊर्ध्व Urdhva, "upwards"; मुख Mukha, "face"; and श्वान Shvana, "dog". The pose is one of those (along with Downward Dog) introduced by the pioneer of yoga as exercise, Krishnamacharya, in the mid-20th century from Surya Namaskar, Salute to the Sun. Before that time, the poses of Surya Namaskar were not considered to be yoga. It was later taught by his pupils Pattabhi Jois and B. K. S. Iyengar.

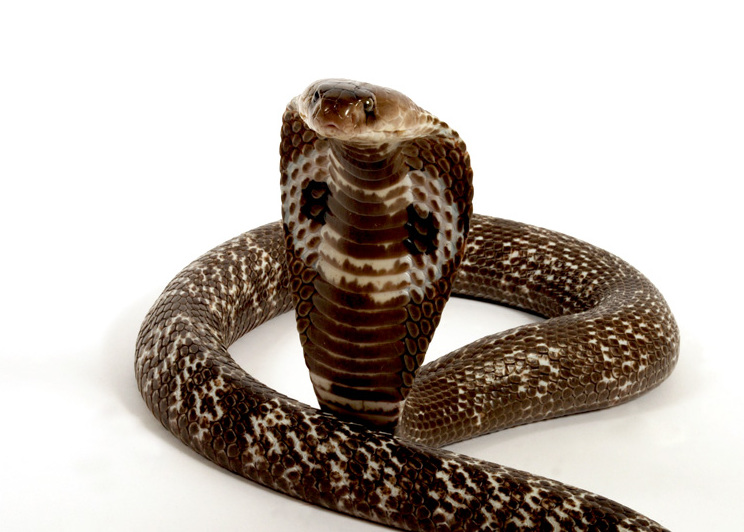
A cobra with its hood raised

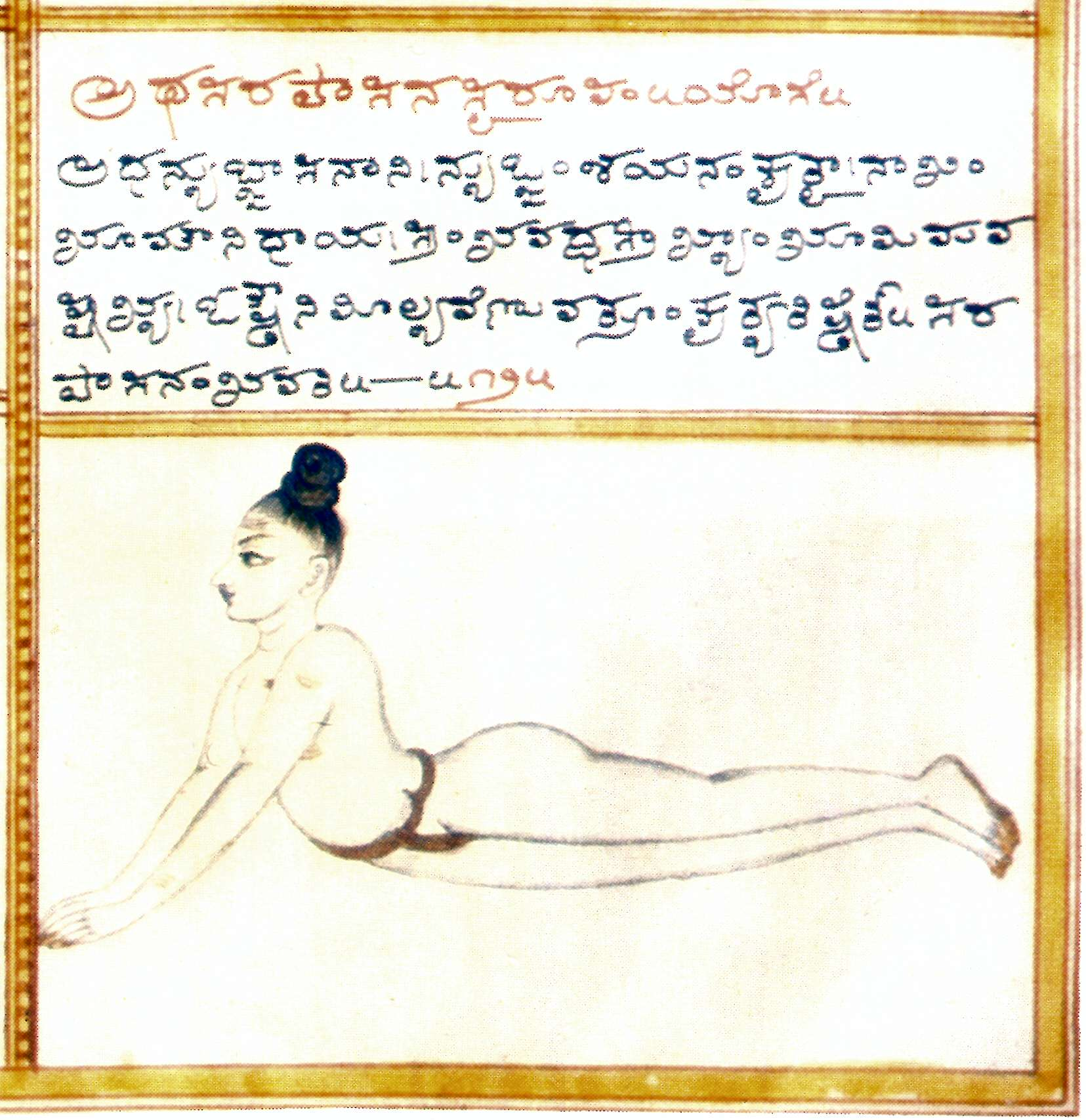
Sarpasana, Serpent Pose, in Sritattvanidhi, 19th century

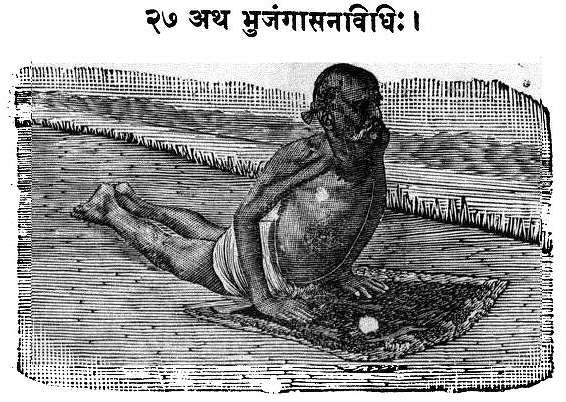
Bhujangasana in Yogasopana Purvacatuska, 1905

== Description ==
This backbending pose may be entered from a prone position or from Downward Dog. The palms are placed under the shoulders, pushing down until the hips lift slightly. The backs of the feet rest on the ground and the legs are outstretched; the gaze is directed forwards, giving the preparatory pose. For the full pose, the back is arched until the arms are straight, and the gaze is directed straight upwards or a little backwards. In Bhujangasana the legs remain on the ground, whereas in Upward Dog the hips, thighs and knees are lifted slightly off the ground. Salabhasana (Locust pose) or Sphinx pose can be used to prepare for Bhujangasana. Bhujangasana is part of the sequence of yoga postures in some forms of Surya Namaskar, the Salute to the Sun. Balasana, child's pose, is one of the counter poses (balancing out the stretch) for Bhujangasana.

Sivananda Saraswati places his palms under each shoulder. His elbows are held close to his body. While performing the backward bend, he recommends focusing on “...feeling the vertebrae bend one by one, until only the part of the body from the navel down touches the floor.” The arms remain passive and should not bear any body weight.

B. K. S. Iyengar places both hands flat on the floor next to his pelvis. He lifts his torso upward using his arms. His weight rests on his legs and palms. He tightens his glutes and engages his thighs to maintain momentum in the backward bend.

In Bikram Yoga, movement is guided upward as far as possible, using only the strength of the back.

According to Heinz Grill, too, the power for active movement should come primarily from the spine. “The arms themselves only give the body some accompanying guidance(...)” It is not the act of raising the body, but rather the extension of the spine – and thus the shaping of the movement – that he considers to be of “most importance”.

Erling Petersen, a student of Swami Narayanananda, advises that, when it comes to the shoulders, they should be kept relaxed and the shoulder blades drawn together.

== Variations ==
An easier variant is Sphinx Pose, sometimes called Salamba Bhujangasana (षलम्ब भुजङ्गासन) "Supported Cobra pose", in which the forearms rest on the ground, giving a gentler backbend. It is used in the long holds of Yin Yoga, either with the forearms on the ground or with the arms straightened. The pose can be modified, such as in pregnancy, by placing a blanket under the pelvis.

Upward Dog pose, abbreviated "Updog", is entered with an inhalation from a prone position (or from Chaturanga Dandasana or Ashtanga Namaskara in a Surya Namaskar cycle), taking the feet a little apart. The legs are stretched out straight, the toes out (not tucked under), and the weight of the body is supported on the hands with outstretched arms so the hips are off the ground. The gaze is directed straight upwards, so the neck and back are arched.

Bhujangasana (Cobra Pose) may help alleviate menstrual cramps by gently stretching the abdomen and lower back, promoting relaxation of surrounding muscles and improving pelvic circulation.

Eagle Pose (Garudasana) is a standing balancing yoga posture that involves wrapping one leg around the other and crossing the arms. It requires concentration, coordination, and strength, and helps stretch the shoulders, upper back, and hips, promoting physical and mental balance.

The King Cobra is a pose for advanced practitioners. Starting from the basic position, arch your head, neck, and chest backward. Your chest should come close to a horizontal plane. Eventually, you may be able to place your feet on your head.

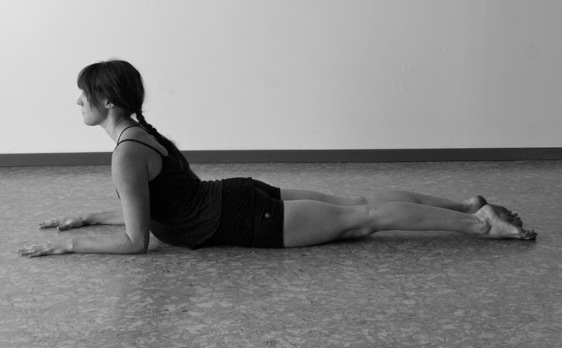
Yin Yoga's Sphinx pose, an easier variant, used in long holds

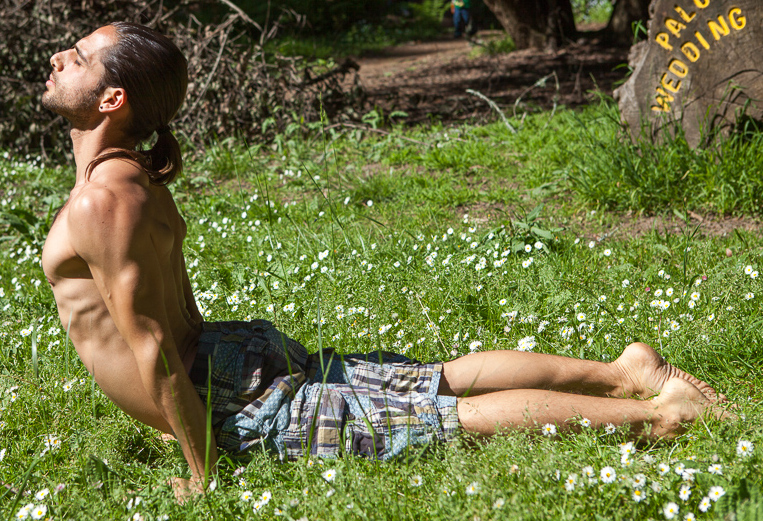
Urdhva Mukha Shvanasana, Upward Dog Pose, has the hips off the ground.

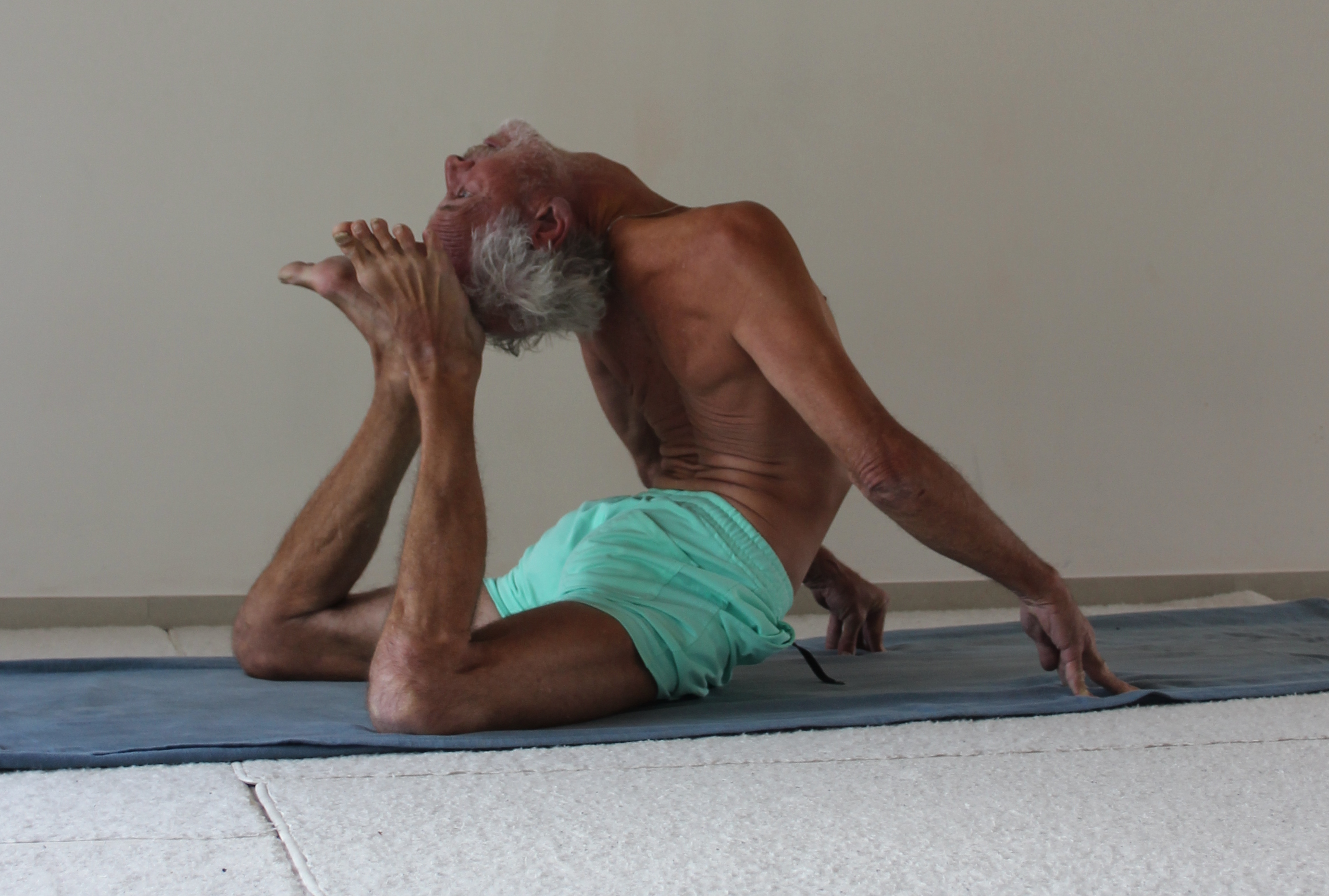
King Cobra Pose Raja Bhujangasana, an advanced yoga pose

== See also ==
- Salabhasana, Locust pose, a prone backbending asana

== Sources ==
- Iyengar, B. K. S. (1979) [1966]. Light on Yoga. Thorsons. ISBN 978-1855381667.
- Jain, Andrea (2015). Selling Yoga: from Counterculture to Pop culture. Oxford University Press. ISBN 978-0-19-939024-3. OCLC 878953765.
- Mehta, Silva; Mehta, Mira; Mehta, Shyam (1990). Yoga: The Iyengar Way. Dorling-Kindersley.
- Newcombe, Suzanne (2019). Yoga in Britain: Stretching Spirituality and Educating Yogis. Bristol, England: Equinox Publishing. ISBN 978-1-78179-661-0.
- Singleton, Mark (2010). Yoga Body: the origins of modern posture practice. Oxford University Press. ISBN 978-0-19-539534-1. OCLC 318191988.
