= Ashtanga =

Astanga or Ashtanga (aṣṭāṅga) is Sanskrit for "having eight limbs". It may refer to:

- Ashtanga (eight limbs of yoga), the eight limbs of yoga as defined by Patanjali in his Yoga Sutras
- Raja yoga, Vivekananda's popularisation of Ashtanga Yoga
- Ashtanga (vinyasa) yoga, a style of asana-based modern yoga founded and popularized by K. Pattabhi Jois
- Ayurveda, the ancient Indian system of medicine, divided into eight limbs
- Ashtanga Namaskara
