= Lunge (exercise) =

Type of exercise

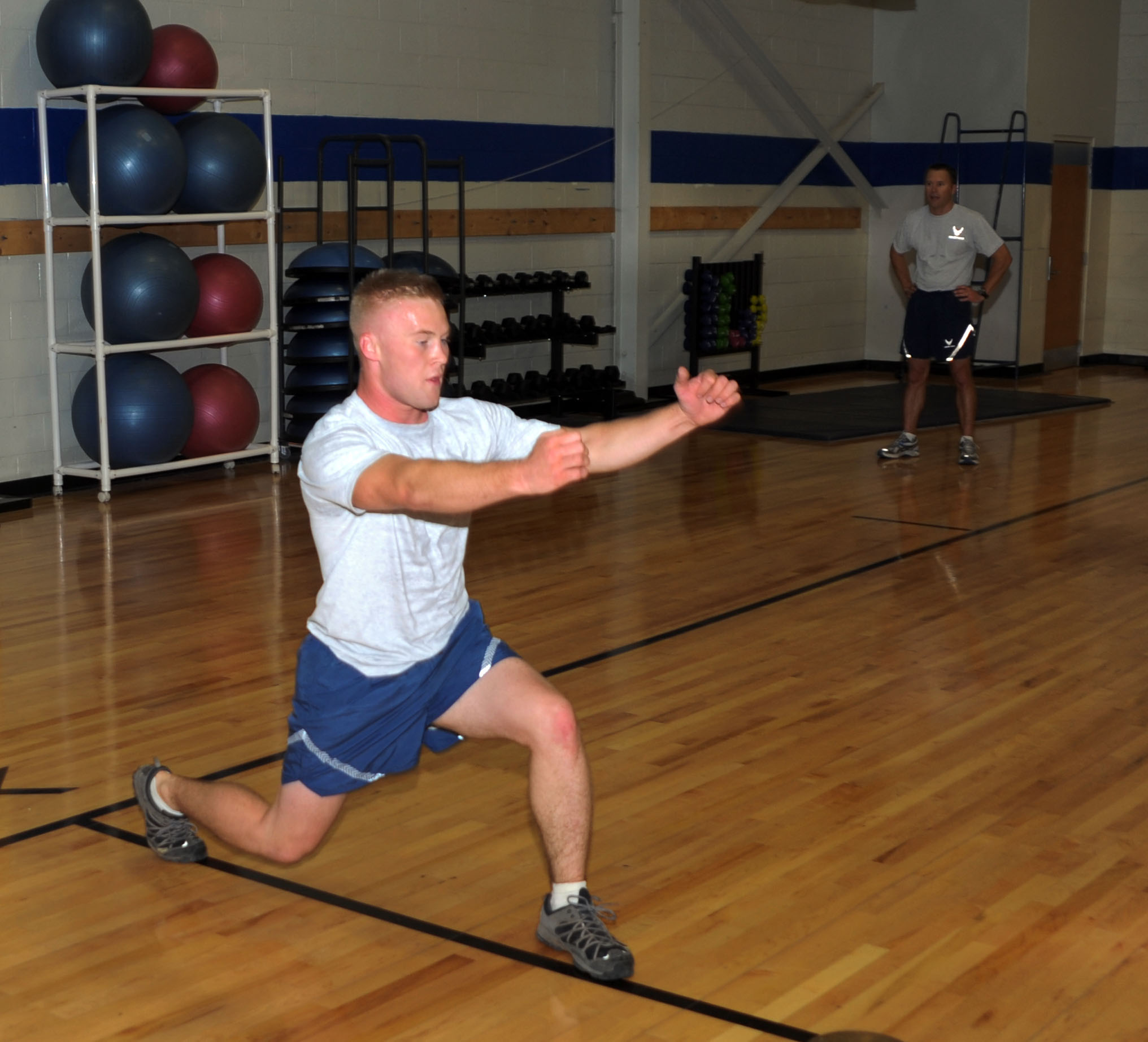

Lunge exercise for older adults

A lunge can refer to any position of the human body where one leg is positioned forward with knee bent and foot flat on the ground while the other leg is positioned behind. It is used by athletes in cross-training for sports, by weight-trainers as a fitness exercise, and by practitioners of yoga as part of an asana regimen.

In contrast to the split squat exercise, during the lunge the rear leg is also activated.

== Strength training ==
Overhead kettlebell lunge and twist

Lunges are a good exercise for strengthening, sculpting and building several muscles/muscle groups, including the quadriceps (or thighs), the gluteus maximus (or buttocks) as well as the hamstrings. A long lunge emphasizes the use of the gluteals whereas a short lunge emphasizes the quadriceps. The lunge is a basic movement that is fairly simple to do for beginner athletes. A lunge can be performed using bodyweight alone. However, weight trainers may seek to increase the difficulty using either dumbbells or kettlebells held in each hand, or a barbell held atop the neck and shoulders. Grip strength may be an issue with the dumbbell lunge so practitioners may prefer the barbell lunge.

As a variation, plyometric lunges (also known as split squat jumps) can be performed by jumping explosively between lunge positions. With resistance training it's not recommended to do forward lunges in place, this is due to the shear force it can place on the rear knee once the front leg no longer provides support.

== Yoga ==
Modern yoga includes several lunge-related asanas such as the Virabhadrasana warrior poses I and II, and others whose names vary in different yoga traditions. Examples of Sanskrit names include Anjaneyasana (Anjaneya's pose), Ashwa Sanchalanasana (equestrian pose), and Ardha Mandalasana (half circle pose). Depending on the lineage and circumstances, the back knee can be down or up, the toes may be tucked or untucked, and the arms may be in any number of positions.

Lunges are often incorporated into Surya Namaskar, a flowing sequence of asanas used as a warm-up and in vinyasa styles of yoga to connect asanas into aerobic exercise sequences.

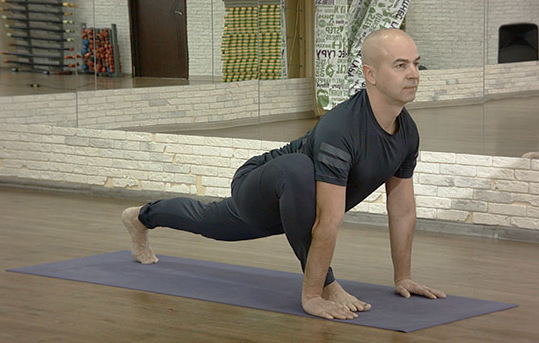
Ashwa Sanchalanasana, equestrian pose, in modern yoga

== See also ==
- Lunge (fencing)
- Partial squat
