= Oculesics =

Study of nonverbal communication via the eyes

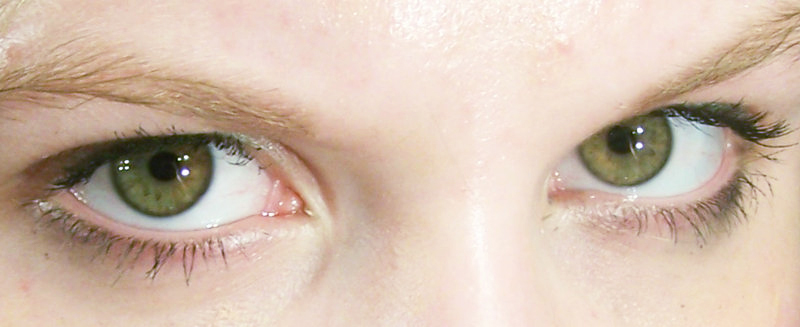
Green eyes

Oculesics, a subcategory of kinesics, is the study of eye movement, behavior, gaze, and eye-related nonverbal communication. The term's specific designation slightly varies apropos of the field of study (e.g., medicine or social science). Communication scholars use the term "oculesics" to refer to the investigation of culturally-fluctuating propensities and appreciations of visual attention, gaze and other implicitly effusive elements of the eyes. Comparatively, medical professionals may ascribe the same appellation to the measurement of a patient's ocular faculty, especially subsequent a cerebral or other injury (e.g., a concussion).

== Nonverbal communication ==
Oculesics is one form of nonverbal communication, which is the transmission and reception of meaning between communicators without the use of words. Nonverbal communication can include the environment around the communicators, the physical attributes or characteristics of the communicators, and the communicators' behavior of the communicators.

The four nonverbal communication cues are known as spatial, temporal, visual, and vocal. Each cue relates to one or more forms of nonverbal communication:

- Chronemics – the study of time
- Haptics – the study of touch
- Kinesics – the study of movement
- Oculesics – the study of eye behavior
- Olfactics – the study of scent
- Paralanguage – the study of voice communication outside of language
- Proxemics – the study of space

== Dimensions of oculesics ==
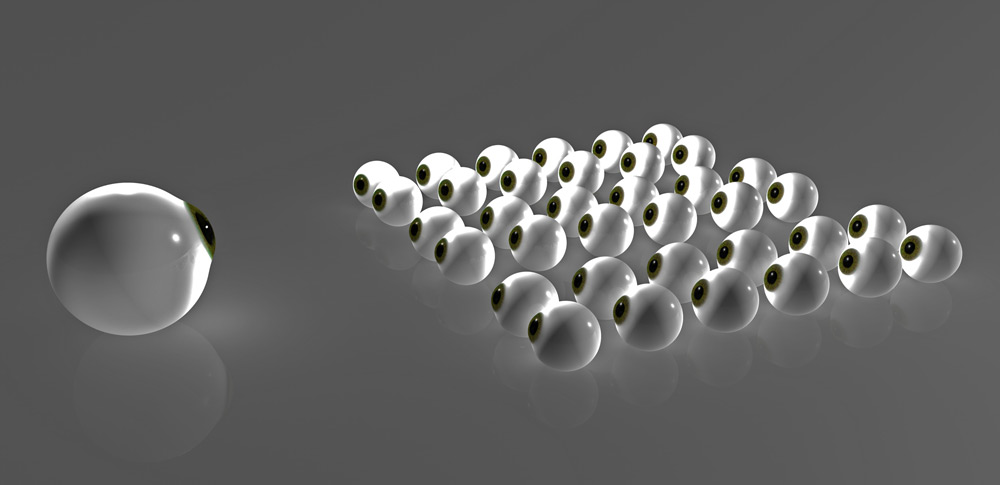
Eye contact is one aspect of oculesics. The others are pupil dilation, eye movement, blinking, and gaze direction.

There are four aspects involved with oculesics:

=== Dimension 1: eye contact ===
There are two methods of assessing eye contact:

- Direct assessment
- Indirect assessment

=== Dimension 2: eye movement ===
Eye movement can occur either voluntarily or involuntarily. Various types of eye movement include changing eye direction, changing focus, or following objects with the eyes. The five types of this movement include saccades, smooth pursuit, vergence, vestibulo-ocular, and optokinetic movements.

=== Dimension 3: pupil dilation ===
Pupillary response

Pupillary response refers to the voluntary or involuntary change in the size of the pupil. The pupils may enlarge or dilate in response to the appearance of real or perceived new objects of focus, or at the real or perceived indication of such appearances.

=== Dimension 4: gaze direction ===
Gazing deals with communicating and feeling intense desire with the eye, voluntarily or involuntarily.

== Theorists and studies ==
Many theorists and studies are associated with nonverbal communication, including the study of oculesics.

=== Ray Birdwhistell ===
Professor Ray Birdwhistell was one of the earliest theorists of nonverbal communication. As an anthropologist, he coined the term kinesics, and defined it as communication and perceived meaning from facial expressions and body gestures.

Birdwhistell spent over fifty years analyzing kinesics. He wrote two books on the subject: Introduction to Kinesics (1952) and Kinesics and Context (1970). He also created films of people communicating and studied their methods of nonverbal communication in slow motion. He published his results in attempt to make general translations of gestures and expressions, although he later acknowledged it was impossible to equate each form of body language with a specific meaning.

Birdwhistell's study of oculesics was greatly enhanced by his use of film. In one study, he filmed which directions and at what objects children looked as they learned activities from their parents.

=== Paul Ekman ===
Dr. Paul Ekman is a psychologist with over five decades of experience researching nonverbal communication, especially with facial expressions. He has written, co-authored, and edited over a dozen books and published over 100 articles on oculesics. He also served as an advisor for the television show Lie to Me, and worked with the Dalai Lama on increasing awareness of the influence of emotion on behavior to help people achieve peace of mind.

Ekman's work in facial expressions includes studies looking for connections between oculesics and other facial movements, eye behavior and physically covering the eyes when recalling personal traumatic events, and on his self-coined phrase, "the Duchenne smile" (named after Guillaume Duchenne), which relates to involuntary movements of the orbicularis oculi, pars orbitalis when smiling sincerely. Most prominently, oculesics play a major role in the Facial Action Coding System, which is a micro-expression database created by Dr. Ekman and his colleagues.

=== Robert Plutchik ===
Professor Robert Plutchik was a psychologist who specialized in communicating emotion with expressions and gestures. Many of his articles and books discuss the influence of emotion on nonverbal communication as well as the effect of those expressions and gestures on emotions.

Professor Plutchik's work on oculesics includes studies on the "synthesis of facial expressions," which look for connections between expressions in the eye along with expressions from the forehead and mouth.

=== Eye movement desensitization and reprocessing ===
Dr. Francine Shapiro developed eye movement desensitization and reprocessing (EMDR) treatment to address diseases such as posttraumatic stress disorder. EMDR communicates with the subject through eye movement in an attempt to re-create meaning and processing of prior traumatic events.

=== Theory of Non-Competitive Stare ===
Theory proposed by psychologist and psychotherapist Carlos Prada which suggests the existence of specific pathways in the visual system through which dominance is transmitted and processed. These pathways go from the dominant eye to the visual cortex and from there to the specific cognitive module for processing. More precisely and depending on the specific lateralization of brain function:

- In right-handed: right eye → optic nerve (through optic chiasm) → visual cortex → cognitive module.
- In left-handed: left eye → optic nerve → visual cortex → cognitive module.
- In ambidextrous: through any two pathways, according lateralization of brain function.

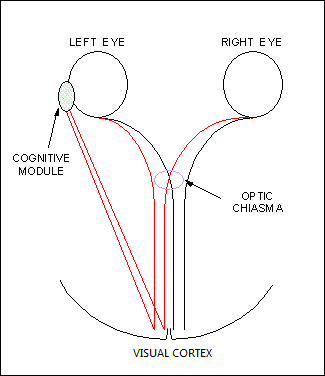
Dominance transmission and processing pathways

Despite the scientific nature of the proposal, the author emphasises the benefits for interpersonal relationships of avoiding looking directly at the dominant eye through which the transmission of ocular dominance is initiated (as proposed by the theory).

As a struggle for power and dominance is established through eye contact, and at the same time, as maintaining eye contact is considered to be a proof of sincerity, self-confidence and credibility, he suggests that eye contact should be maintained staring at the non-dominant eye, thus avoiding the specific routes of dominance transmission. This will mean a substantial improvement in interpersonal relationships.

From the experience that empirical evidence provides and valuing the characteristics of lateralization of brain function between individuals, he proposes that the appropriate technique consists in staring at the left eye (non-dominant) of right-handed people, and at the right eye (non-dominant) of left-handed people. The improvement in interpersonal relationships would take place as much in the case of establishing new relations as in already established ones.

== Communicating emotions ==
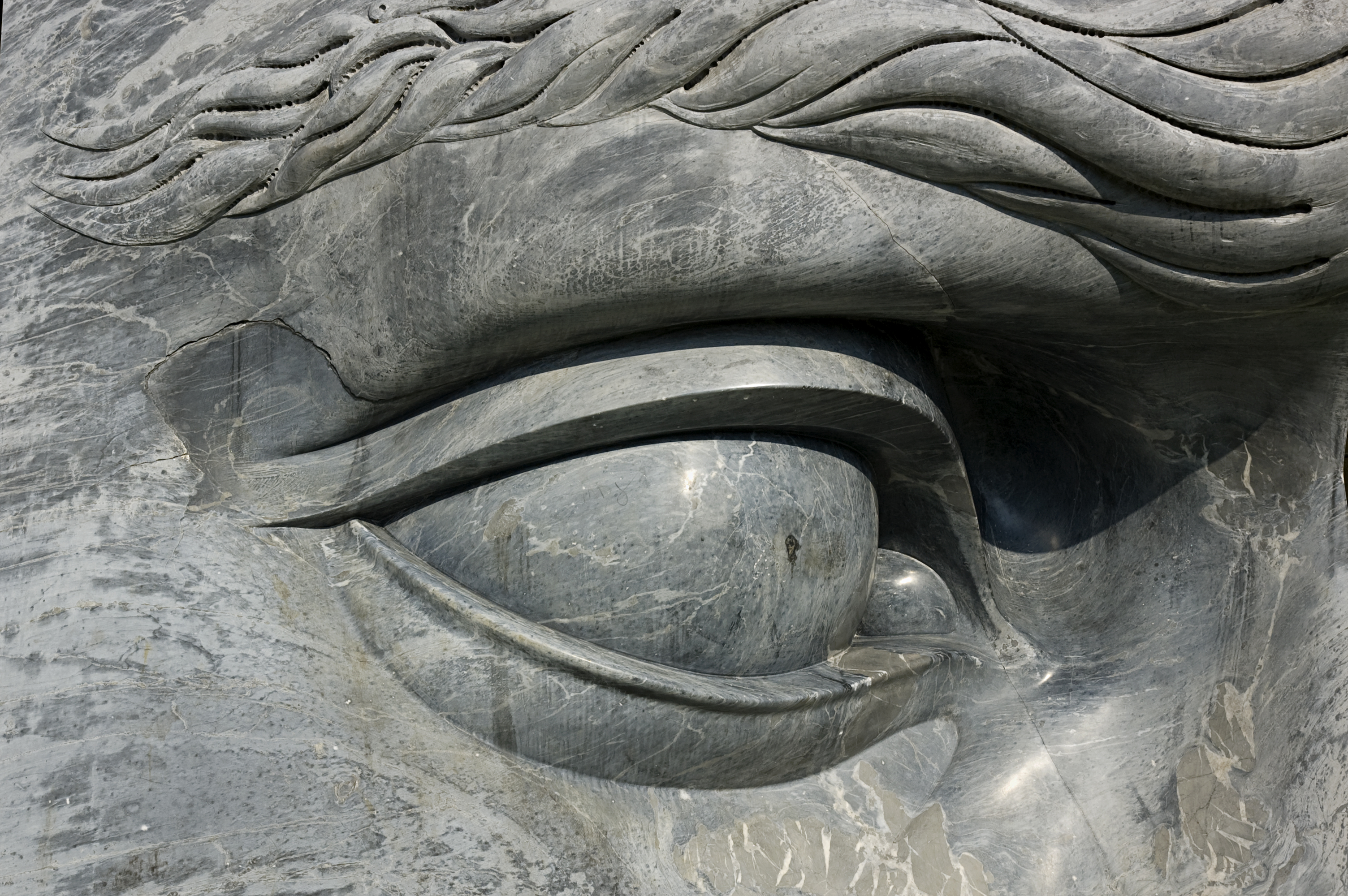

In the book Human Emotions, author Carroll Ellis Izard says "a complete definition of emotion must take into account all three of these aspects or components: (a) the experience or conscious feeling of emotion; (b) the processes that occur in the brain and nervous system; and (c) the observable expressive patterns of emotion, particularly those on the face" (p.4). This third component is where oculesics plays a role in nonverbal communication of emotion.

Oculesics is a primary form of communicating emotion. The pseudoscientific study of neuro-linguistic programming (NLP) established three main types of thinking regarding what someone sees, hears, or feels. According to this pseudoscience, oculesics can show which type of thinking someone is using when they are communicating. A person thinking visually might physically turn their eyes away, as if to look at an imagined presentation of what they are thinking, even to the point of changing the focus of their eyes. Someone thinking in terms of hearing might turn their eyes as much as possible to one of their ears. A person thinking in terms of what they feel could look downwards as if looking toward their emotions coming from their body.

Whether or not someone intends to send a particular meaning or someone else perceives meaning correctly, the exchange of communication happens and can initiate emotion. It is important to understand these dynamics because we often establish relationships (on small and grand scales) with oculesics.

=== Lists of emotions ===

There are many theories on how to annotate a specific list of emotions. Two prominent methodologies come from Dr. Paul Ekman and Dr. Robert Plutchik.

Dr. Ekman states there are 15 basic emotions – amusement, anger, contempt, contentment, disgust, embarrassment, excitement, fear, guilt, pride in achievement, relief, sadness/distress, satisfaction, sensory pleasure, and shame – with each of these fifteen stemming out to similar and related sub-emotions.

Dr. Plutchik says there are eight basic emotions, which have eight opposite emotions, all of which create human feelings (which also have opposites). He created Plutchik's Wheel of Emotions to demonstrate this theory.

Perceptions and displays of emotions vary across time and culture. Some theorists say that even with these differences, there can be generally accepted "truths" about oculesics, such as the theory that constant eye contact between two people is physically and mentally uncomfortable.

Emotions with eye summary:

- Anxiety – wetness or moisture in the eyes
- Anger – eyes glaring and wide open
- Boredom – eyes not focused, or focused on something else
- Desire – eyes wide, dilation of pupils
- Disgust – rapid turning away of eyes
- Envy – glaring
- Fear – eyes wide, or looking downward; may also be closed
- Happiness – "glittery" look to eyes, wrinkled at the sides
- Interest – intense focus, perhaps squinting
- Pity – heavy gaze to eyes, moisture in eyes
- Sadness – tears in eyes, looking downward; may have a sleepless appearance
- Shame – eyes looking down while head is turned down
- Surprise – eyes wide open

Eye behaviors with emotional summaries:

- Eyes up – Different people look up for different reasons. Some look up when they are thinking. Others look upward in an effort to recall something from their memory. It may also indicate a person's subconscious display boredom. The head position is also considered - for example, an upwards look with a lowered head can be a coy, suggestive action.
- Eyes down – Avoiding eye contact, or looking down, can be a sign of submission or fear. It may also indicate that someone feels guilty. However, depending on the culture of the person, it may also be a sign of respect.
- Lateral movement of eyes – Looking away from the person from whom one is speaking could be a sign that something else has taken their interest. It may also mean that a person is easily distracted. Looking to the left can mean that a person is trying to remember a sound while looking to the right can mean that the person is actually imagining the sound. Side-to-side movement, however, can indicate that a person is lying.
- Gazing - Staring at someone means that a person shows sincere interest. For instance, staring at a person's lips can indicate that someone wants to kiss another person. The subject of someone's gaze can communicate what that person wants.
- Glancing – Glancing can show a person's true desires. For example, glancing at a door might mean that someone wants to leave, while glancing at a glass of water might mean that a person is thirsty.
- Eye contact – Eye contact is powerful and shows sincere interest if it is unbroken. A softening of the stare can indicate sexual desire. Breaking that eye contact can be threatening to the person who does not break eye contact.
- Staring – Staring is more than just eye contact; it usually involves eyes wider than normal. A lack of blinking may indicate more interest, but it may also indicate a stronger feeling than a person may intend. Prolonged eye contact can be aggressive, affectionate, or deceptive.
- Following with the eyes – Eyes follow movement naturally. If a person is interested in someone, then their eyes will naturally follow that person.
- Squinting – Squinting of the eyes may mean a person is trying to obtain a closer look. It may also mean that a person is considering whether something is true or not. Liars may use squinting as a tool to keep others from detecting their dishonesty. Squinting may also be just a result of a bright sun.
- Blinking – Blinking is a natural response that can occur for no other reason than having dry eyes. It can also be the result of a person feeling greater levels of stress. Rapid blinking can indicate arrogance while reduced blinking can move towards a stare.
- Winking – Winking can indicate that two people are non-verbally communicating a shared understanding. It can mean "hello" or it can be a sign of flirtation.
- Closing of eyes – Closing the eyes may be a response to fear or embarrassment. Others may close their eyes as a way to think more sincerely about a particular subject.
- Eye moisture – Tears can indicate sadness, but they are also used to wash and clean the eyes. Damp eyes can be suppressed by crying or an expression of extreme happiness or laughter. In many cultures, men are not expected to cry but may experience damp eyes in place of crying.
- Pupil dilation – Pupil dilation may be harder to detect by most people. Sexual desire may be a cause of such dilation. It may also be an indication of attraction. Physiologically, the eyes dilate when it is darker to let in more light.
- Rubbing of eyes – Eyes may water, causing a person to rub their own eyes. This can happen when a person feels uncomfortable or tired. It may also happen when a person simply has something in their eyes.

== Cultural impact ==
=== Cultural differences in nonverbal communication ===
In his essay The Coordinated Management of Meaning (CMM), Dr. W. Barnett Pearce discusses how people derive meaning in communication based on reference points gained or passed down to them culturally.

Winston Bremback said, "To know another's language and not his culture is a good way to make a fluent fool of oneself." Culture in this sense, includes all of the nonverbal communication, customs, thought, speech and artifacts that make a group of people unique. Brembeck knew of the significant role that communication plays besides language. While most nonverbal communication is conveyed subconsciously, there are cultural similarities that enable us to understand the difference between what is being said and what is actually meant. But generalizing non-verbal communication between cultures can be tricky since there are as many cultural differences in nonverbal communication as there are different languages in the world.

While growing up, a child will typically spend a couple of years learning to communicate verbally while simultaneously learning the idiosyncrasies of nonverbal communication of their culture. In fact, the first couple of years of a child's life is spent learning most of these nonverbals. The differences between cultures are thus ingrained at the very earliest points of development.

=== Projected similarity ===
Anthropologists have proven for years that nonverbal communication styles vary by culture. Most people, however, are not only oblivious to the differences in these nonverbal communication styles within their own culture, but they also assume that individuals from other cultures also communicate in the same way that they do. This is a phenomenon called projected similarity. The result of projected similarity is that misperceptions, misinterpretations, and misunderstandings occur in cross-cultural interactions when a person interprets another's nonverbal communication in the light of his or her own cultural norms.

While all nonverbal communication differs greatly among cultures, perhaps none is so obviously different as the movement and study of eye contact. A particular nonverbal interaction between two individuals can have completely different meanings in different cultures. Even within that same culture, oculesics plays a tremendous role in obtaining meaning from other nonverbal cues. This is why, even in the same culture, humans still have trouble sometimes understanding each other because of their varying eye behavior, nonverbal cues, and cultural and personal differences.

=== Stereotypes in cultural differences ===
It is because of these personal differences, that in studying cultural communication patterns we sometimes find it necessary to speak in stereotypes and generalizations. Just as one might say that Puerto Ricans who speak Spanish tend to use a louder voice than others communicating at the same distance, it would not be fair to say that all Puerto Ricans exhibit the same qualities. There are obviously enormous variations within each culture. These variations can depend on age, gender, geographical location, race, socioeconomic status, and personality. Because there are so many factors to study, most are generally glossed over in favor of stereotypes and generalizations.

=== Some oculesic findings from around the world ===
The effect that eye movement has on human behavior has been widely studied. In some cultures, however, this study actually allows for insights into individuals whose only way of communication is by nonverbal means. Studies show that eye behavior shows special patterns in psychiatric patients, autistic children, and persons from diverse cultures. In some countries, doctors use the study of oculesics to test stimulation among patients and interest levels in children who are not as expressive verbally. While lack of eye contact in many cultures can signal either disinterest or respect, depending on the culture of the individual, it may be an insight into a patient's brain functions at the time of observation.

==== Latin American culture vs. Anglo Saxon culture ====
There are several differences between Anglo Saxon culture and Latino/Latin American cultures, both in the way the two groups interact with each other as well as the way they interact with members of other cultural groups. Besides the obvious language differences, nonverbal communication is the most noticeable difference between the two groups. Specifically, within nonverbal communication, eye contact and eye behavior can actually help one differentiate between the cultural backgrounds of two individuals by looking at nothing but their eyes.

Sociologists have found that Anglo-Saxons tend to look steadily and intently into the eyes of the person to whom they are speaking. Latinos will look into the eyes of the person to whom they are speaking, but only in a fleeting way. Latinos tend to look into the other person's eyes, and then immediately their eyes tend to wander when speaking. In traditional Anglo-Saxon culture, averting the eyes in such a way usually portrays a lack of confidence, certainty, or truthfulness. In the Latino culture, direct or prolonged eye contact can also indicate that you are challenging the individual with whom you are speaking, or that you have a romantic interest in the person.

==== Muslim culture ====
In the Islamic faith, most Muslims lower their heads and try not to focus on the opposite sex's features save for the hands and face. This is a show of respect but also a cultural rule which enforces Islamic law. Lustful glances at those of the opposite sex are also prohibited.

==== Western Pacific Nations ====
Many western Pacific nations share much of the same cultural customs. Children, for instance, are taught in school to direct their eyes to their teacher's Adam's apple or tie knot. This continues through adulthood, as most Asian cultures lower their eyes when speaking to a superior as a gesture of respect.

==== East Asia and Northern Africa ====
In many East Asian and north African cultures such as Nigeria,[6] it is also respectful not to look the dominant person in the eye. The seeking of constant unbroken eye contact by the other participant in a conversation can often be considered overbearing or distracting- even in Western cultures.

==== United States ====
In the United States, eye contact may serve as a regulating gesture and is typically associated with respect, attentiveness, and honesty. Americans associate direct eye contact with forthrightness and trustworthiness.

==== Dealing with cultural differences ====
Across all cultures, communicators and leaders become successful because they observe the unconscious actions of others. Sometimes an individual's actions are the result of their culture or upbringing and sometimes they are the result of the emotion they are portraying. Keen communicators are able to tell the difference between the two and effectively communicate based on their observations. Oculesics is not a standalone science. Combining the information obtained from eye movements and behaviors with other nonverbal cues such as Haptics, Kinesics, or Olfactics will lend the observer a much more well-rounded and accurate portrait of an individual's behavior.

According to social scientists, individuals need to first become consciously aware of their own culture before being able to interpret differences among other cultures. In learning about our own culture, we learn how we are different from the cultures of those around us. Only then, will we become aware of the differences among the cultures of others. Finally, we should undergo acculturation, that is, borrow attributes from other cultures that will help us function effectively without in any way having to relinquish our own cultural identities. In Nonverbal Communication, Nine-Curt stresses that "we should develop, refine, and constantly practice the skill of switching cultural channels, as on a TV set, in order to be able to interact with people from other cultures, and often with people from subcultures within our own, more effectively. This is indispensable if we are to avoid the pain, frustration, and discomfort that usually accompany trying to move and live in a culture different from our own. As we become proficient in this skill, we will find it less difficult and highly satisfying to accept others and their styles of living.

== See also ==
- Jacques Lacan
- Orthoptics
- Visual perception
- Vision therapy
- Drishti
