= Anjaneyasana =

Posture in yoga as exercise

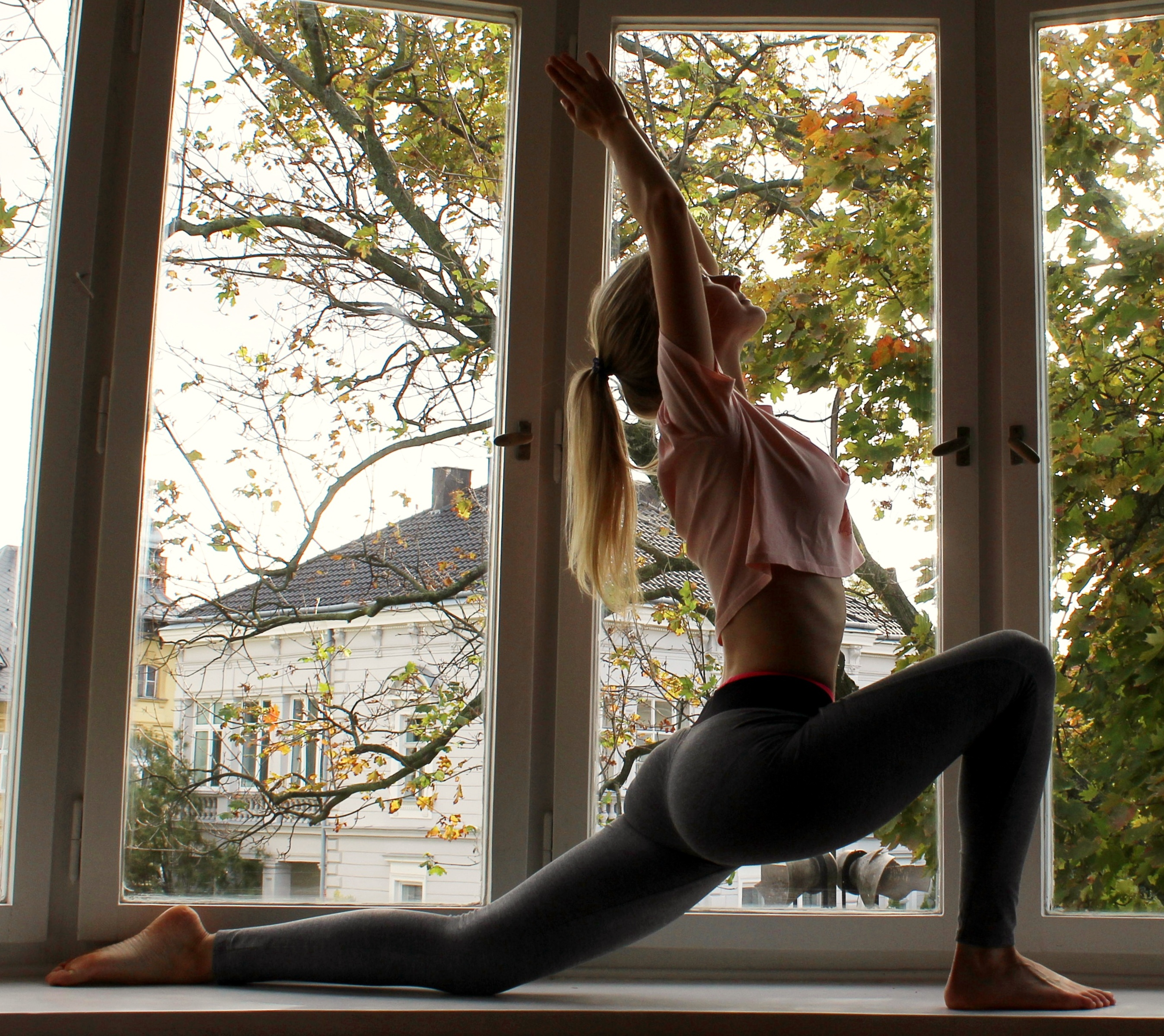
Anjaneyasana, Crescent Moon pose

Anjaneyasana (Sanskrit: अञ्जनेयासन, romanized: añjaneyāsana, lit. 'son of Añjanī pose'), Crescent Moon Pose, Low Lunge, or Ashva Sanchalanasana (Equestrian Pose) is a lunging back bending asana in modern yoga as exercise.

It is sometimes included as one of the asanas in the Surya Namaskar sequence, though usually with arms down in that case. Variations include Parivritta Anjaneyasana (rotated Anjaneyasana), and Utthana Pristhasana, Lizard Pose.

== Etymology and origins ==
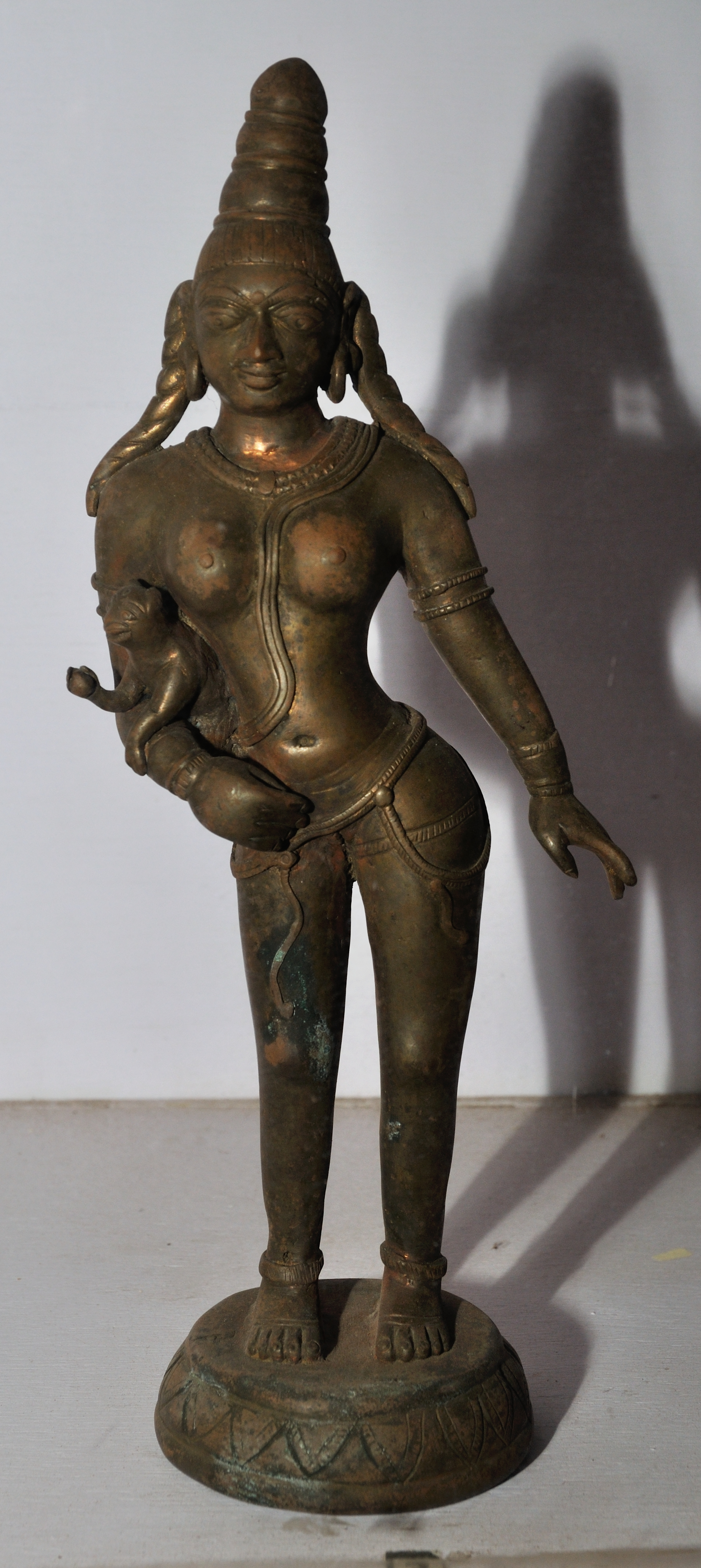
Pallava era statuette of Anjani with her child Hanuman

The name Anjaneya is a matronymic for the Hindu deity Hanuman, whose mother's name is Anjani. Hanuman is a central figure in the epic Rāmāyaṇa, and an important Iṣṭa-devatā in devotional worship.

Like many standing asanas, Anjaneyasana was unknown in medieval hatha yoga, and was brought into modern yoga as exercise in the 20th century from Indian martial arts. It is used in schools of modern yoga as exercise such as Sivananda Yoga. It is included as one of the asanas in Ashtanga Yoga's type 1 Surya Namaskar sequence.

== Description ==
The asana is entered from a lunge, with the back knee lowered to the ground, the back arched and the arms raised and stretched over the head. The toes of the back foot are pointed back in styles such as Ashtanga Yoga and other styles, the top of the foot on the floor, though in other styles such as Sivananda Yoga the toes are tucked under. The front foot remains in standing position, the hips lowered close to the front foot and the front knee fully bent and pointing forwards.

== Variations ==
Parivritta Anjaneyasana, a preparatory pose for Parivritta Parsvakonasana (where the rear knee is off the floor), is the rotated form of the pose. This has the opposite elbow to the bent forward knee, and the rear knee on the floor.

Utthana Pristhasana, Lizard pose, is a variant with the forearms on the floor.

Moving the front foot on to its side so the knee comes to the ground enables a transition to a related back bend, Rajakapotasana.

In the full asana in Ashtanga Yoga, Raja Anjaneyasana, the rear foot is lifted and grasped with both hands, the head resting on the lifted foot, and the elbows pointing up.

Some teachers use the names Crescent Moon Pose or High Lunge for a lunge with raised knee and raised hands, as in Virabhadrasana I but on the ball of the back foot. The pose is more difficult than Anjaneyasana (Low Lunge) as it requires both strength and balance. The pose can be performed using a chair, either holding the back of the chair with the outstretched hands, or with the back of the front thigh resting on the chair seat.

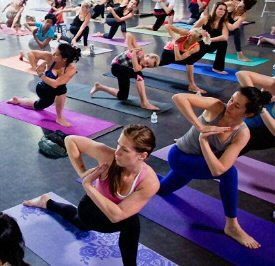
Yoga class in Parivritta Anjaneyasana

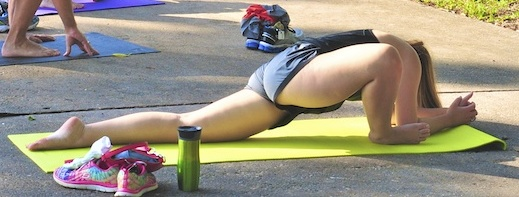
Utthana Pristhasana, Lizard pose

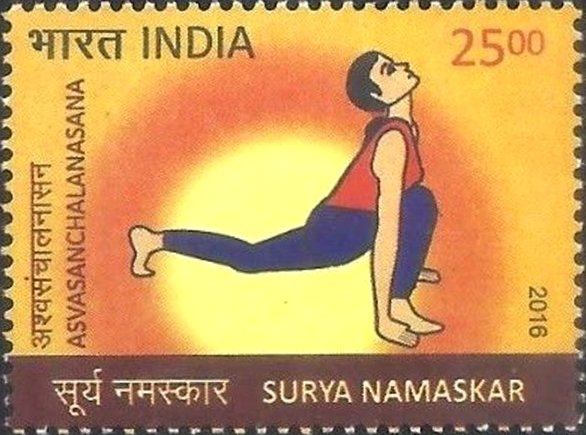
Aśvasanchalasana (Equestrian Pose) with hands on the floor and the rear knee raised, on a 25 rupee Indian postage stamp in 2016, part of a series on Surya Namaskar

== See also ==
- Ardha Chandrasana, half moon pose
- Hanumanasana, the front-back splits, the front leg straight out
