= Sun Salutation =

Series of yoga positions performed in a particular order

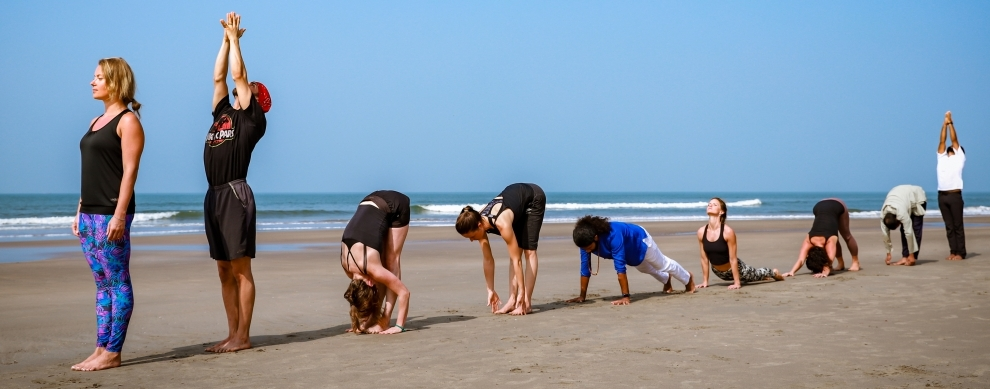
The stages of one form of Surya Namaskar, Salute to the Sun, demonstrated by a class of yoga teachers in training in Goa, India

Sun Salutation, also called Surya Namaskar or Salute to the Sun (Sanskrit: सूर्यनमस्कार, IAST: Sūryanamaskāra), is a practice in yoga as exercise incorporating a flow sequence of some twelve linked asanas. The asana sequence was first recorded as yoga in the early 1900's, with Pratinidhi being one of the first to publish a book on the subject. The basic sequence involves moving from a standing position into Downward and Upward Dog poses and then back to the standing position, but many variations are possible. The number of asanas is between 8 and 12 depending on the version being taught. In some Indian traditions, the positions are each associated with a different mantra, and with seed sounds or bīja.

The precise origins of the Sun Salutation are uncertain, but the sequence was made popular in the early 20th century by Bhawanrao Shriniwasrao Pant Pratinidhi, the Rajah of Aundh, and by Krishnamacharya in the Mysore Palace, where the Sun Salutation classes were held next door to his yogasala. Pioneering yoga teachers taught by Krishnamacharya, including Pattabhi Jois and B. K. S. Iyengar, taught transitions between asanas derived from the Sun Salutation to their pupils worldwide.

== Etymology and origins ==
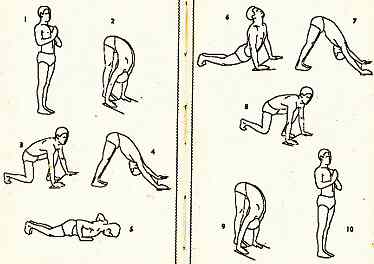
Bhawanrao Shriniwasrao Pant Pratinidhi provided this double-page guide to the Sun Salutation at the back of his 1928 book The Ten-Point Way to Health: Surya Namaskars as well as in the body of the text, stating that it could be removed for use without damaging the text of the book.

The name Surya Namaskar is from the Sanskrit सूर्य Sūrya, "Sun" and नमस्कार Namaskāra, "Greeting" or "Salute". Surya is the Hindu god of the sun. This identifies the Sun as the soul and source of all life. Chandra Namaskara is similarly from Sanskrit चन्द्र Chandra, "Moon".

The origins of the Sun Salutation are vague; Indian tradition connects the 17th century saint Samarth Ramdas with Surya Namaskara exercises, without defining what movements were involved. In the 1920s, Bhawanrao Shriniwasrao Pant Pratinidhi, the Rajah of Aundh, popularized and named the practice, describing it in his 1928 book The Ten-Point Way to Health: Surya Namaskars. It has been asserted that Pant Pratinidhi invented it, but Pant stated that it was already a commonplace Marathi tradition. Sunila Kale and Christian Novetzke argue that Pant Pratinidhi saw Surya Namaskar as a form not of haṭha yoga, but of the wider psychophysical yoga tradition.

Ancient but simpler Sun salutations such as Aditya Hridayam, described in the "Yuddha Kaanda" Canto 107 of the Ramayana, are not related to the modern sequence. The anthropologist Joseph Alter states that the Sun Salutation was not recorded in any Haṭha yoga text before the 19th century. At that time, the Sun Salutation was not considered to be yoga, and its postures were not considered asanas; the pioneer of yoga as exercise, Yogendra, wrote criticising the "indiscriminate" mixing of sun salutation with yoga as the "ill-informed" were doing.

Elliott Goldberg called Vishnudevananda's 1960 sequence (positions 5 to 8 shown) in his The Complete Illustrated Book of Yoga a "new utilitarian conception of Surya Namaskara", in which he rejected his guru Sivananda's view of it as a health cure.

The yoga scholar-practitioner Norman Sjoman suggested that Krishnamacharya, "the father of modern yoga", used the traditional and "very old" Indian wrestlers' exercises called dandas (Sanskrit: दण्ड daṇḍa, a staff), described in the 1896 Vyayama Dipika, as the basis for the sequence and for his transitioning vinyasas. Different dandas closely resemble the Sun Salutation asanas Tadasana, Padahastasana, Caturanga Dandasana, and Bhujangasana. Krishnamacharya was aware of the Sun Salutation, since regular classes were held in the hall adjacent to his Yogasala in the Rajah of Mysore's palace. The yoga scholar Mark Singleton states that "Krishnamacharya was to make the flowing movements of sūryanamaskār the basis of his Mysore yoga style". Krishnamacharya's students, K. Pattabhi Jois, who created Ashtanga (vinyasa) yoga, and B. K. S. Iyengar, who created Iyengar Yoga, both learned Sun Salutation and flowing vinyasa movements between asanas from Krishnamacharya and used them in their styles of yoga.

The historian of modern yoga Elliott Goldberg writes that Vishnudevananda's 1960 book The Complete Illustrated Book of Yoga "proclaimed in print" a "new utilitarian conception of Surya Namaskara" which his guru Sivananda had originally promoted as a health cure through sunlight. Goldberg notes that Vishnudevananda modelled the positions of the Sun Salutation for photographs in the book, and that he recognised the sequence "for what it mainly is: not treatment for a host of diseases but fitness exercise."

== Description ==
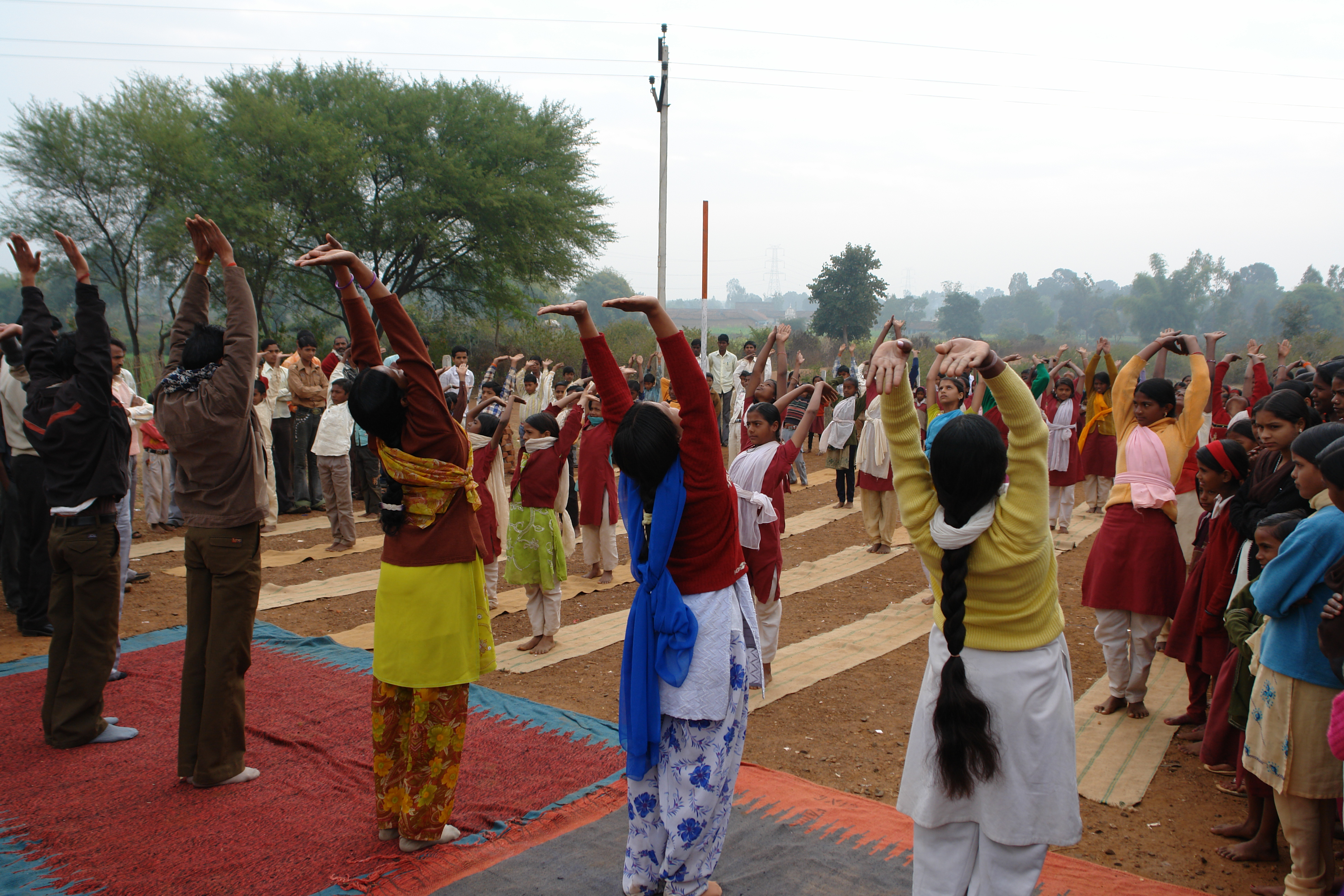
Sun Salutation at a public yoga event in Katni, India

=== Iyengar yoga ===
The Sun Salutation is a sequence of around twelve yoga asanas connected by jumping or stretching movements, varying somewhat between schools. In Iyengar Yoga, the basic sequence is Tadasana, Urdhva Hastasana, Uttanasana, Uttanasana with head up, Adho Mukha Svanasana (Downward Dog), Urdhva Mukha Svanasana (Upward Dog), Chaturanga Dandasana, and then reversing the sequence to return to Tadasana; other poses can be inserted into the sequence.

=== Sivananda yoga ===
In Sivananda yoga, the Sun Salutation sequence differs slightly from the Iyengar sequence (poses marked in italics): Tadasana, Urdhva Hastasana, Uttanasana, Anjaneyasana (low lunge), Phalakasana (high plank), Chaturanga Dandasana, Urdhva Mukha Svanasana, Adho Mukha Svanasana, and then reversing the sequence to return to Tadasana.

=== Ashtanga yoga ===
The founder of Ashtanga Yoga, K. Pattabhi Jois, stated that "There is no Ashtanga yoga without Surya Namaskara, which is the ultimate salutation to the Sun god." The school has two traditional Sun Salutation sequences, types A and B.

- The type A sequence of asanas is Pranamasana, Urdhva Hastasana, Uttanasana, Phalakasana (high plank), Chaturanga Dandasana, Urdhva Mukha Svanasana, Adho Mukha Svanasana, Uttanasana and back to Pranamasana.
- The type B sequence of asanas (differences marked in italics) is Pranamasana, Utkatasana, Uttanasana, Ardha Uttanasana, Phalakasana, Chaturanga Dandasana, Urdhva Mukha Svanasana, Adho Mukha Svanasana, Virabhadrasana I, repeat from Phalakasana onwards with Virabhadrasana I on the other side, then repeat Phalakasana through to Adho Mukha Svanasana (a third time), Ardha Uttanasana, Uttanasana, Utkatasana, and back to Pranamasana.

A newer variant, type C, incorporates Ashtanga Namaskara with a mix of the other two types.

=== A sequence with Ashtanga Namaskara ===
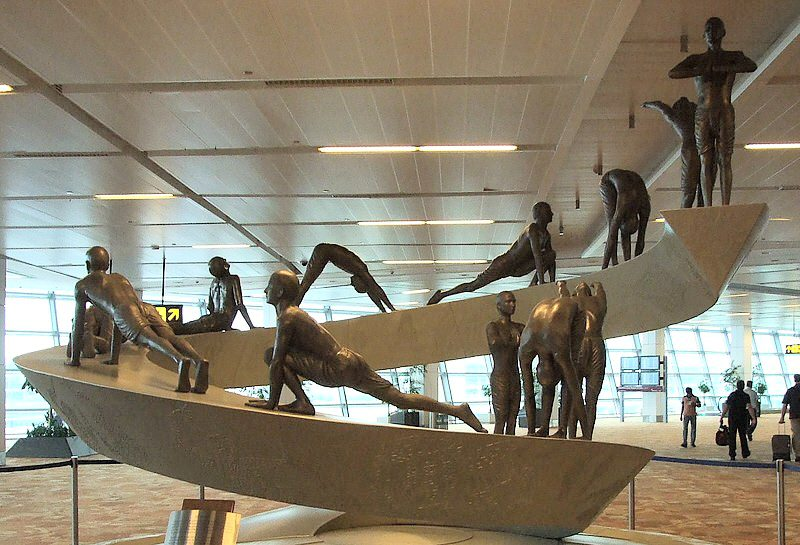
Sculpture of the 12 asanas of the form of the Sun Salutation incorporating Ashtanga Namaskara in place of Caturanga Dandasana in Indira Gandhi Airport, Delhi (figures sculpted by Nikhil Bhandari)

In some traditions, including Pratinidhi's, Ashtanga Namaskara (Knees, Chest, Chin pose) is substituted for Chaturanga Dandasana. A Sun Salutation cycle incorporating this pose is:

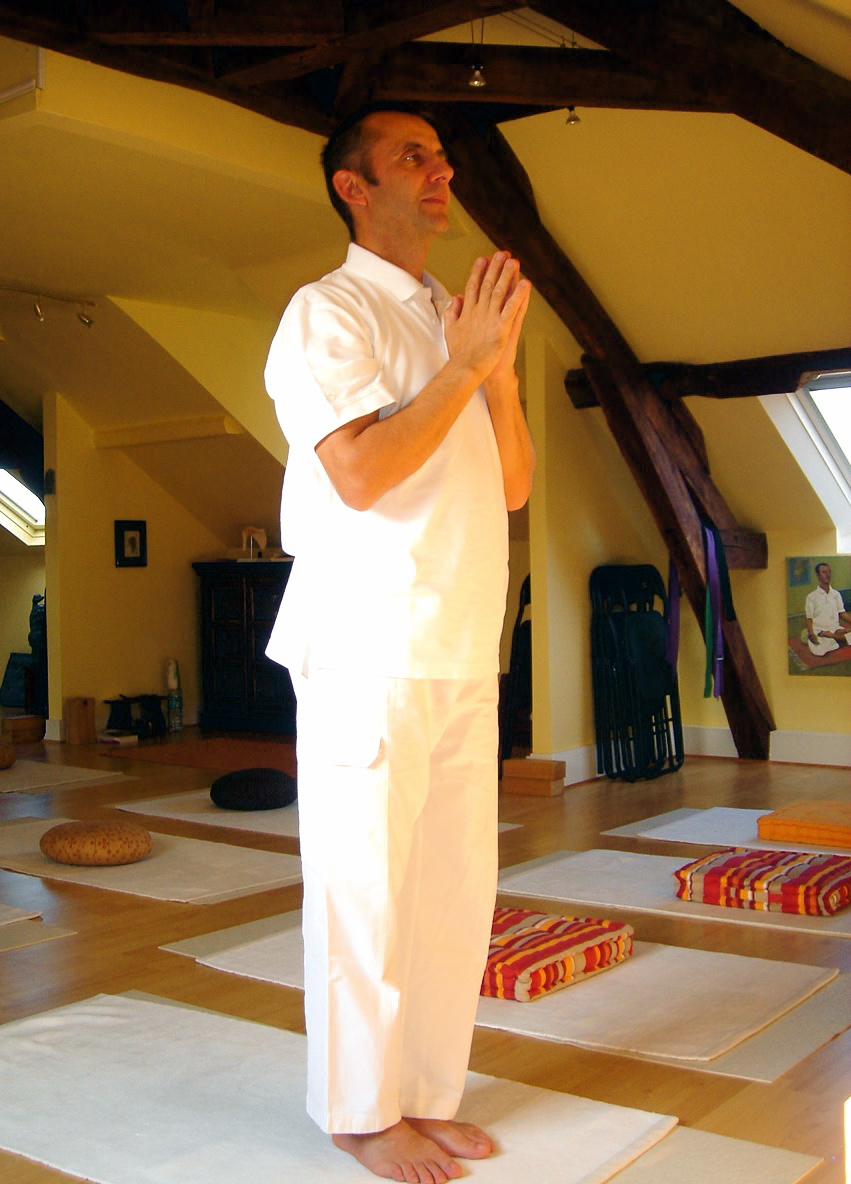
1: Pranamasana

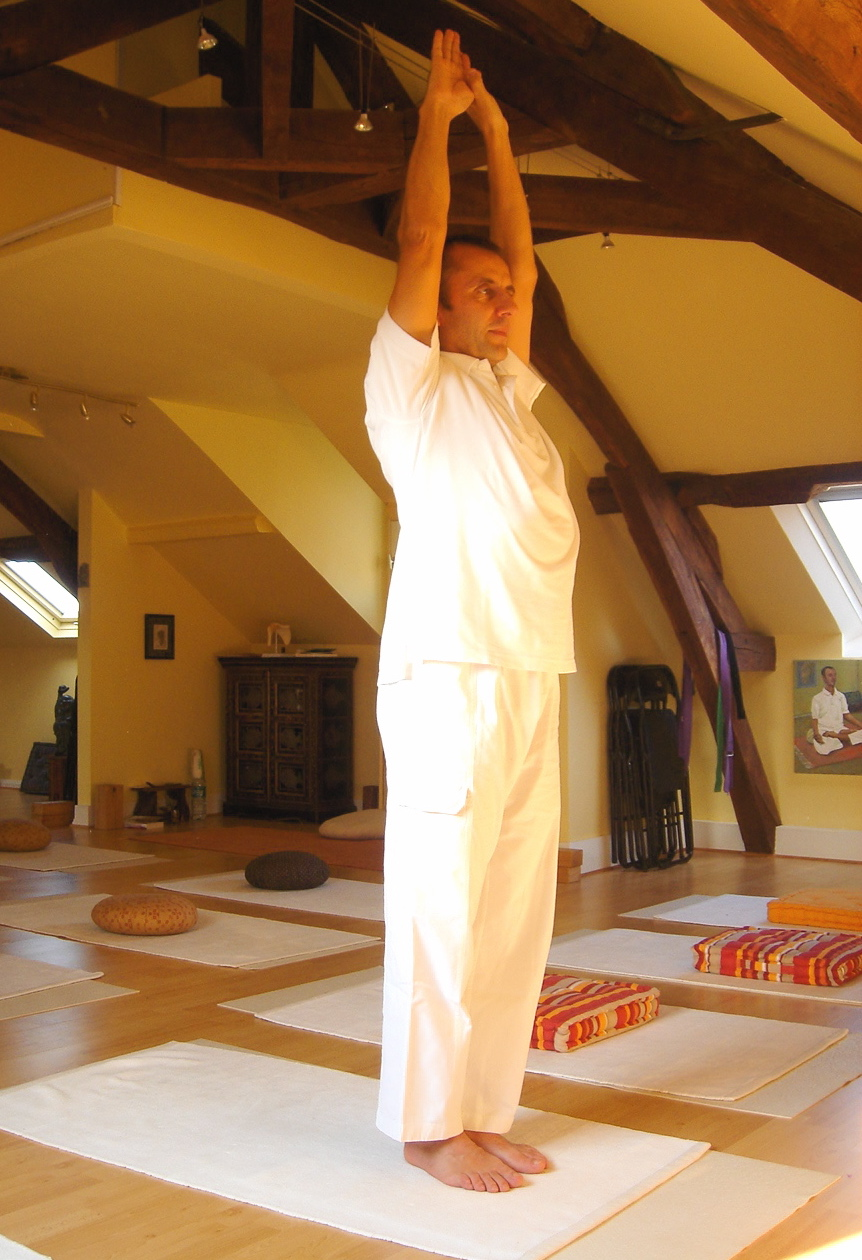
2: Hasta Uttanasana

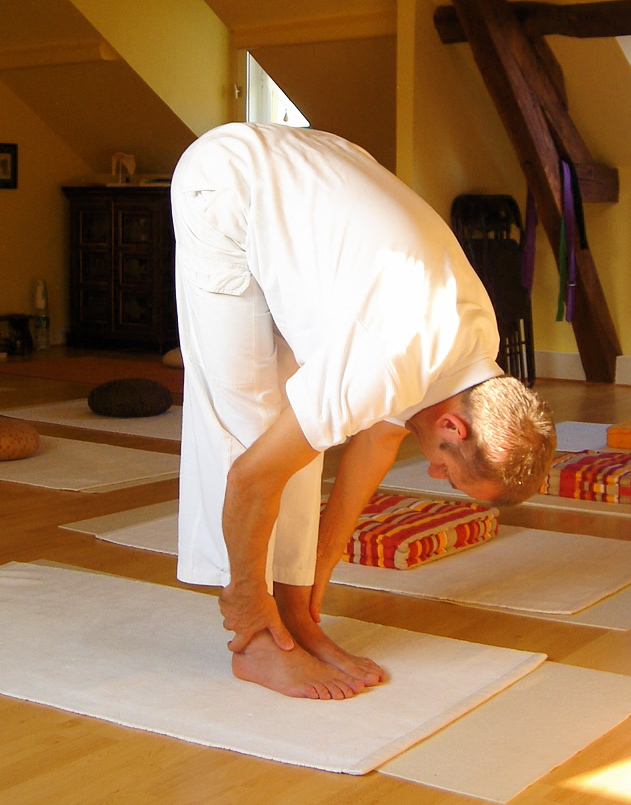
3. Uttanasana

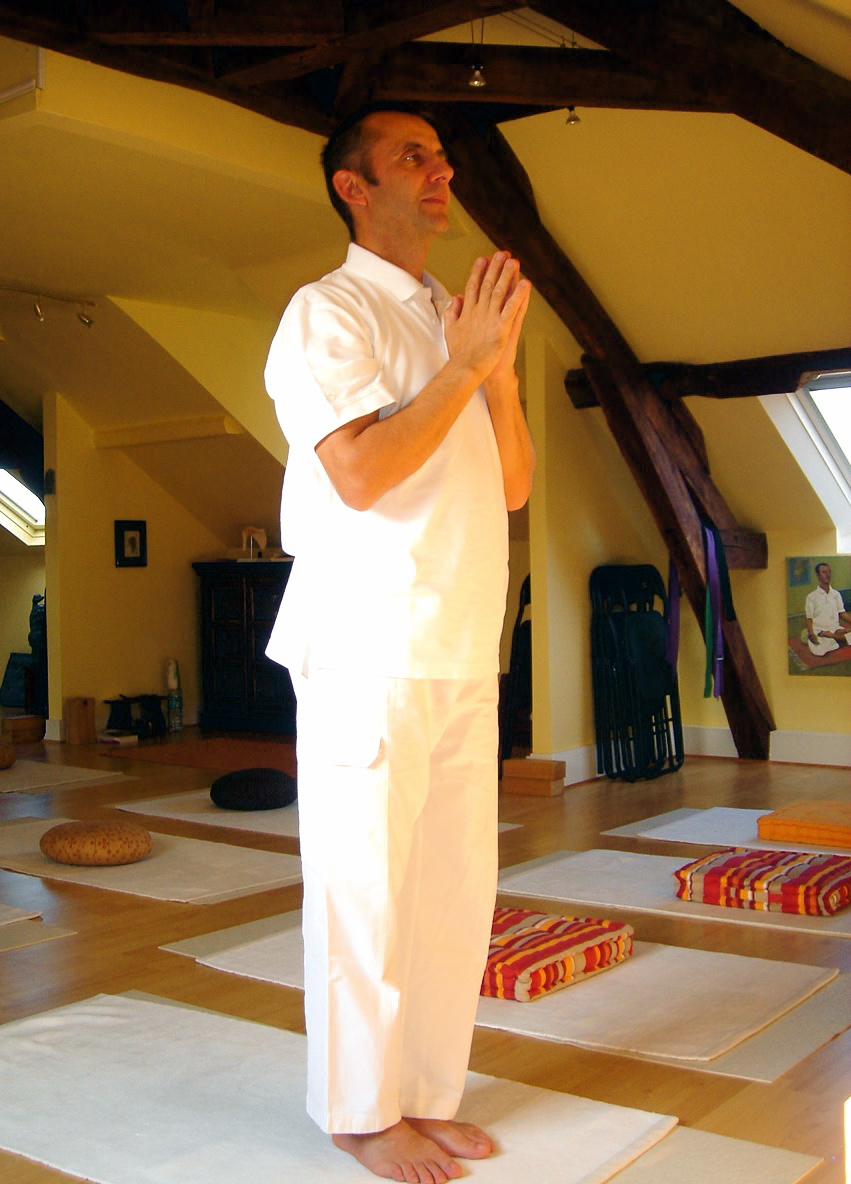
12: Back to 1

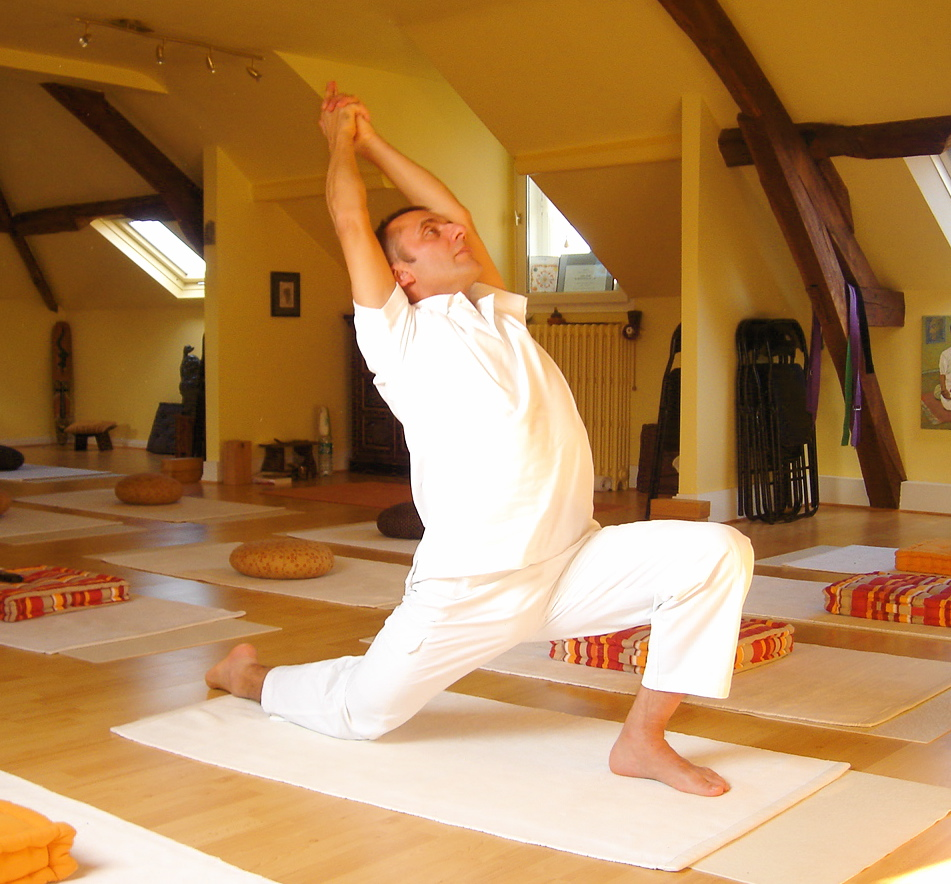
4. Anjaneyasana

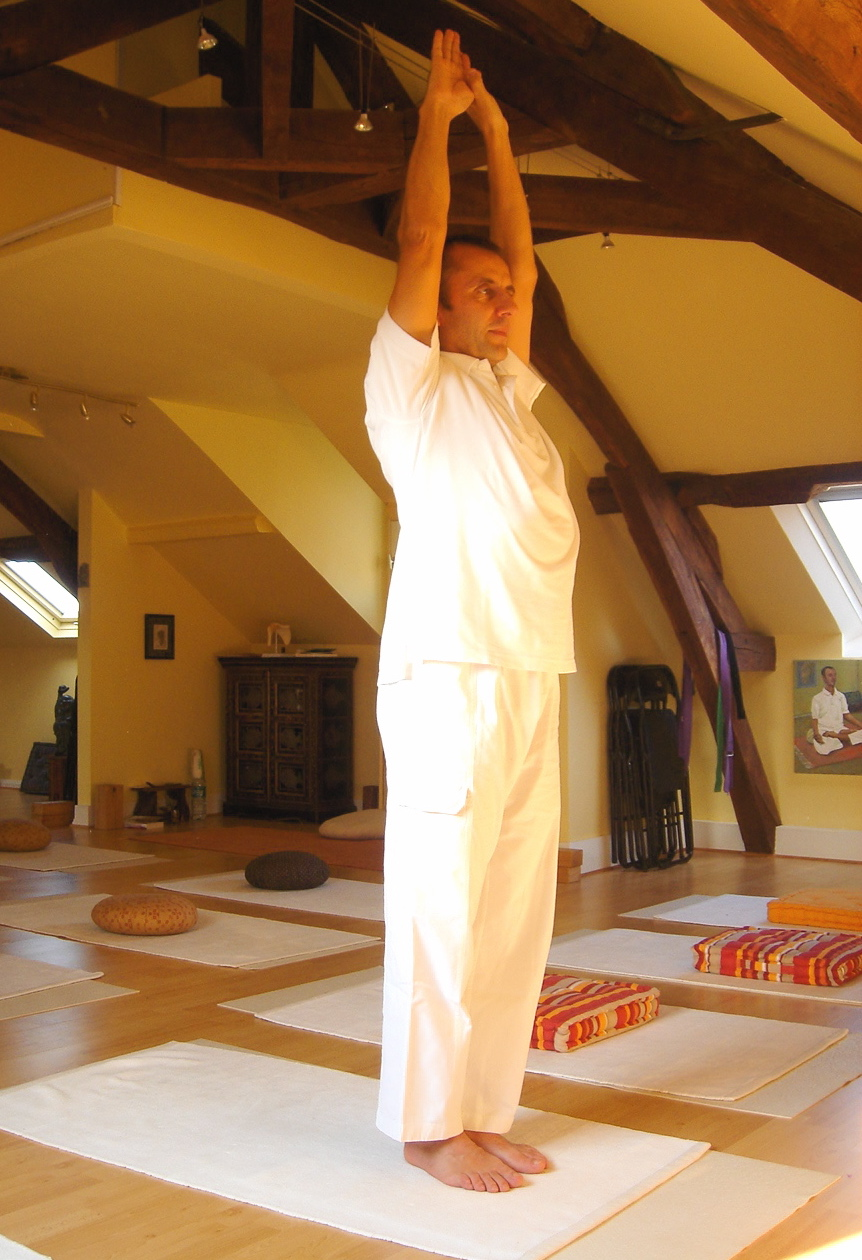
11. Hasta Uttanasana

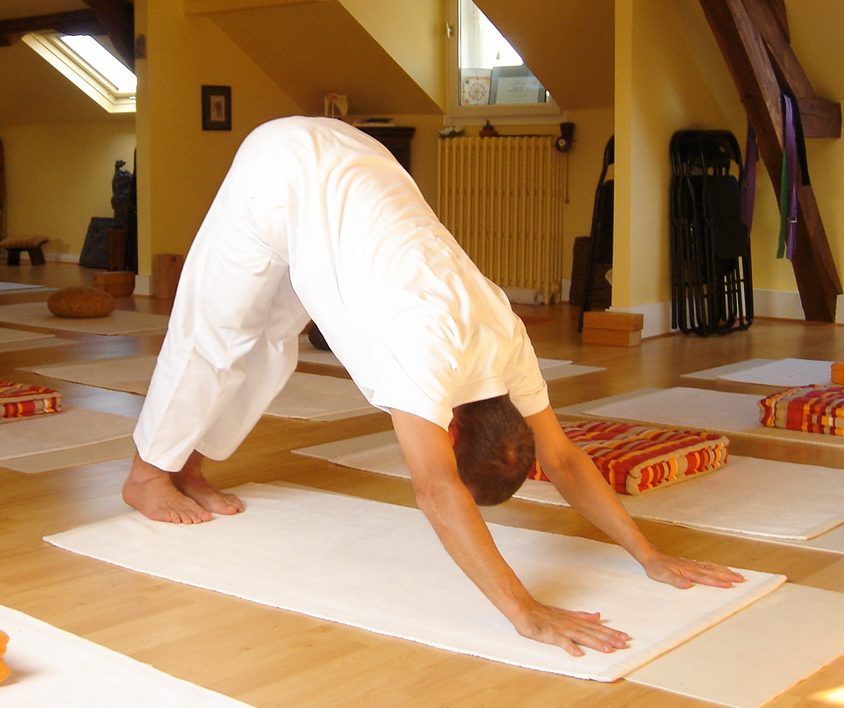
5. Adho Mukha Svanasana

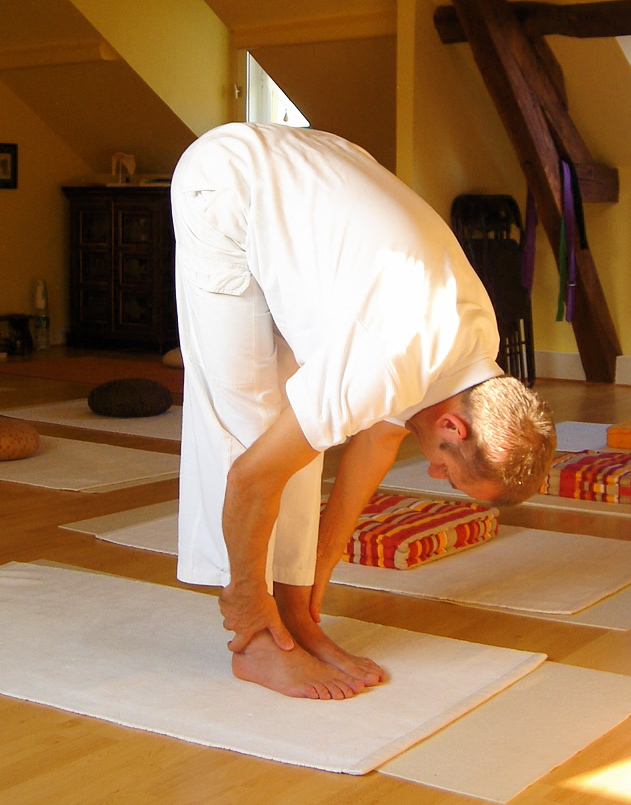
10. Uttanasana

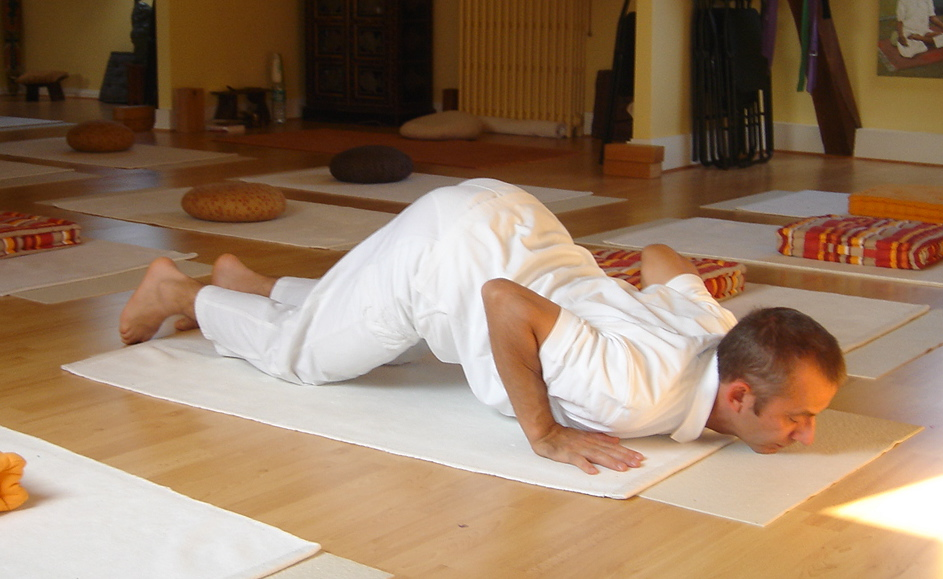
6. Ashtanga Namaskara

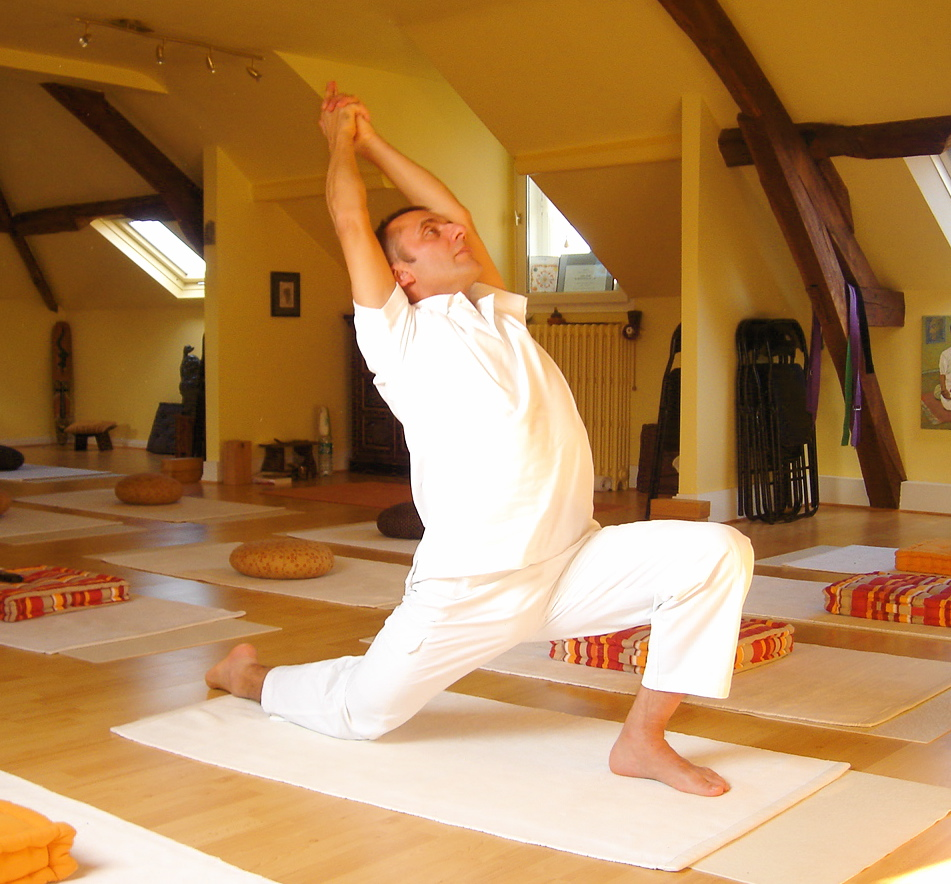
9. Anjaneyasana, opposite foot

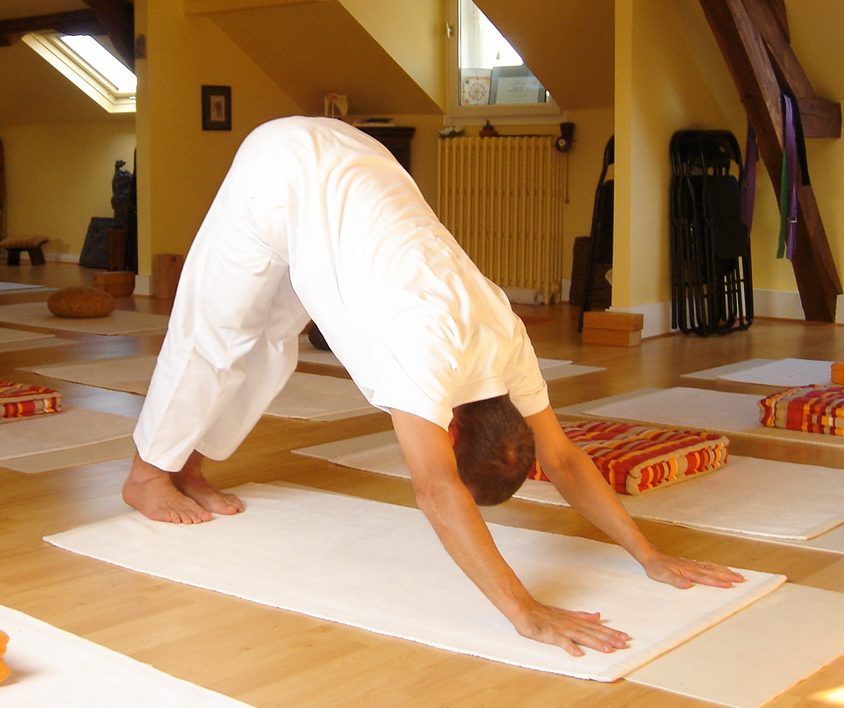
8. Adho Mukha; Svanasana

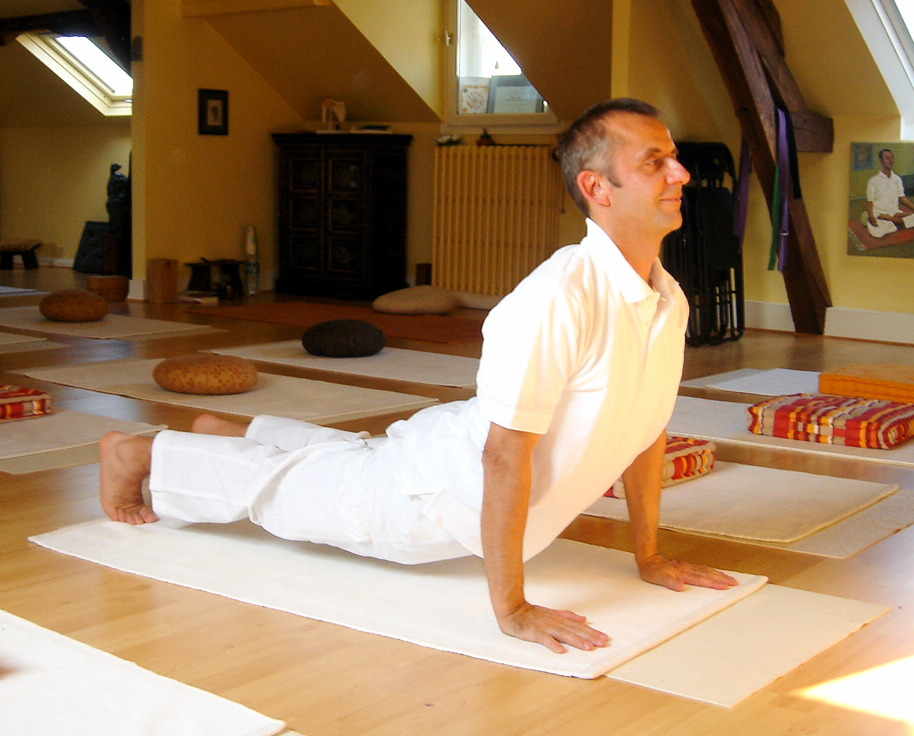
7.Urdhva Mukha; Shvanasana

== Mantras ==
In some yoga traditions, each step of the sequence is associated with a mantra. In traditions including Sivananda Yoga, the steps are linked with twelve names of the deity Surya, the Sun:

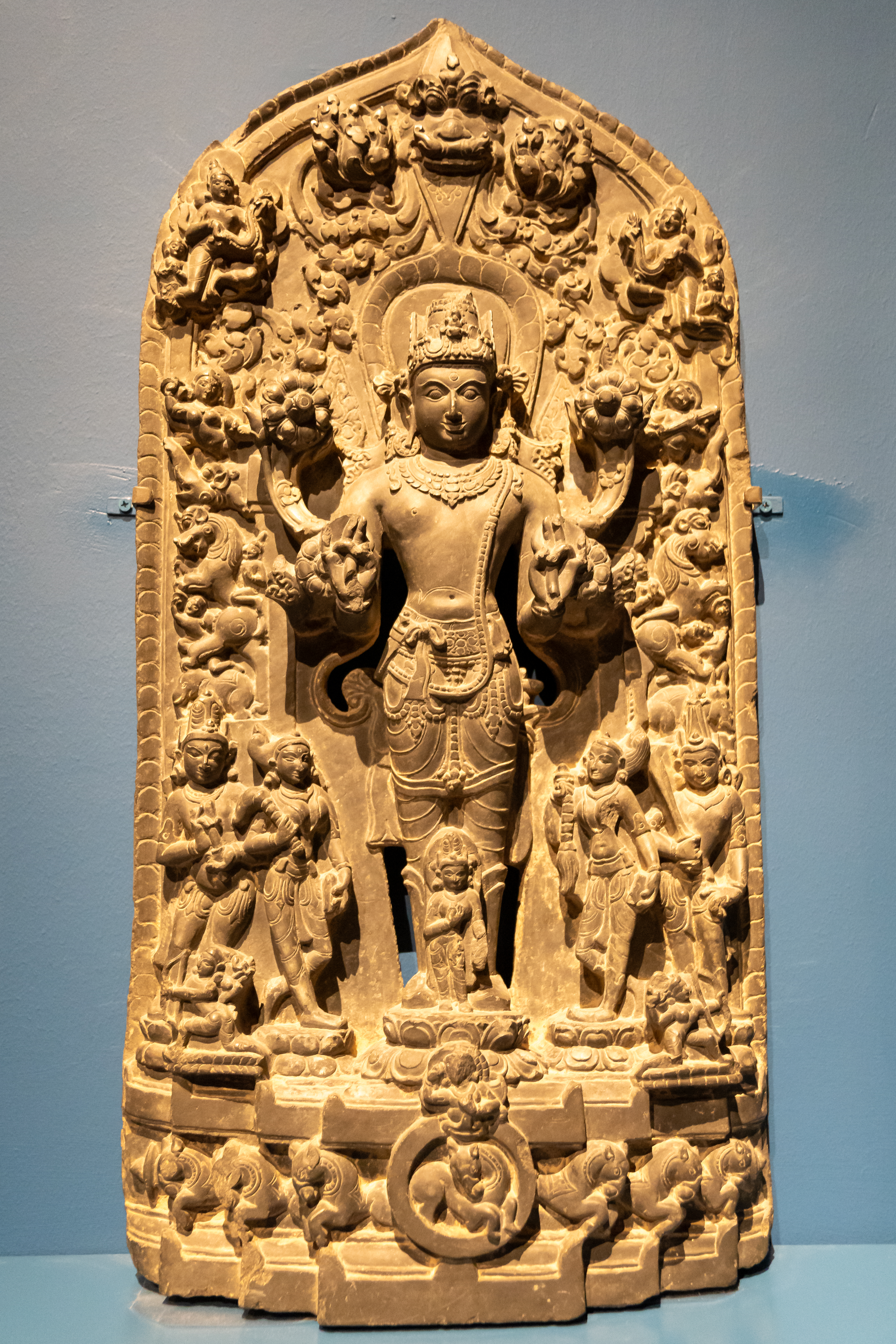
Some yoga traditions use a mantra with a name of the Sun god Surya for each step of Surya Namaskar. 12th century Pala dynasty sculpture of Surya pictured.

Step (Asana)	Mantra (name of Surya)	Translation: Om, greetings to the one who ...
Tadasana	ॐ मित्राय नमः Oṃ Mitrāya Namaḥ	is affectionate to all
Urdhva Hastasana	ॐ रवये नमः Oṃ Ravaye Namaḥ	is the cause of all changes
Uttanasana	ॐ सूर्याय नमः Oṃ Sūryāya Namaḥ	induces all activity
Anjaneyasana	ॐ भानवे नमः Oṃ Bhānave Namaḥ	diffuses light
Adho Mukha Svanasana	ॐ खगाय नमः Oṃ Khagāya Namaḥ	moves in the sky
Ashtanga Namaskara	ॐ पूष्णे नमः Oṃ Pūṣṇe Namaḥ	nourishes all
Bhujangasana	ॐ हिरण्यगर्भाय नमः Oṃ Hiraṇya Garbhāya Namaḥ	contains the golden rays
Adho Mukha Svanasana	ॐ मरीचये नमः Oṃ Marīcaye Namaḥ	possesses raga
Anjaneyasana	ॐ आदित्याय नमः Oṃ Ādityāya Namaḥ	is son of Aditi
Uttanasana	ॐ सवित्रे नमः Oṃ Savitre Namaḥ	produces everything
Urdhva Hastasana	ॐ अर्काय नमः Oṃ Arkāya Namaḥ	is fit to be worshipped
Tadasana	ॐ भास्कराय नमः Oṃ Bhāskarāya Namaḥ	is the cause of lustre

Indian tradition associates the steps with six Bīja ("seed" sound) mantras and with five chakras (focal points of the subtle body).

An Indian tradition links the steps with five chakras, pictured.

Step (Asana)	Bīja mantra (Note: The Bījā mantras are sounds, not translatable words.)	Chakra	Breathing
Tadasana	ॐ ह्रां Oṃ Hrāṁ	Anahata	exhale
Urdhva Hastasana	ॐ ह्रीं Oṃ Hrīṁ	Vishuddhi	inhale
Uttanasana	ॐ ह्रूं Oṃ Hrūṁ	Svadhisthana	exhale
Ashwa Sanchalanasana	ॐ ह्रैं Oṃ Hraiṁ	Ajna	inhale
Adho Mukha Svanasana	ॐ ह्रौं Om Hrauṁ	Vishuddhi	exhale
Ashtanga Namaskara	ॐ ह्रः Oṃ Hraḥ	Manipura	suspend
Bhujangasana	ॐ ह्रां Oṃ Hrāṁ	Svadhisthana	inhale
Adho Mukha Svanasana	ॐ ह्रीं Oṃ Hrīṁ	Vishuddhi	exhale
Ashwa Sanchalanasana	ॐ ह्रूं Oṃ Hrūṁ	Ajna	inhale
Uttanasana	ॐ ह्रैं Oṃ Hraiṁ	Svadhisthana	exhale
Urdhva Hastasana	ॐ ह्रौं Oṃ Hrauṁ	Vishuddhi	inhale
Tadasana	ॐ ह्रः Oṃ Hraḥ	Anahata	exhale

== Variations ==
=== Inserting other asanas ===
Many variations are possible. For example, in Iyengar Yoga the sequence may intentionally be varied to run Tadasana, Urdhva Hastasana, Uttanasana, Adho Mukha Svanasana, Lolasana, Janusirsasana (one side, then the other), and reversing the sequence from Adho Mukha Svanasana to return to Tadasana. Other asanas that may be inserted into the sequence include Navasana (or Ardha Navasana), Paschimottanasana and its variations, and Marichyasana I.

=== Chandra Namaskar ===
Variant sequences named Chandra Namaskar, the Moon Salutation, are sometimes practised; these were created late in the 20th century. One such sequence consists of the asanas Tadasana, Urdhva Hastasana, Anjaneyasana (sometimes called Half Moon Pose), a kneeling lunge, Adho Mukha Svanasana, Bitilasana, Balasana, kneeling with thighs, body, and arms pointing straight up, Balasana with elbows on ground, hands together in Anjali Mudra behind the head, Urdhva Mukha Svanasana, Adho Mukha Svanasana, Uttanasana, Urdhva Hastasana, Pranamasana, and Tadasana. Other Moon Salutations with different asanas have been published.

== Effects ==
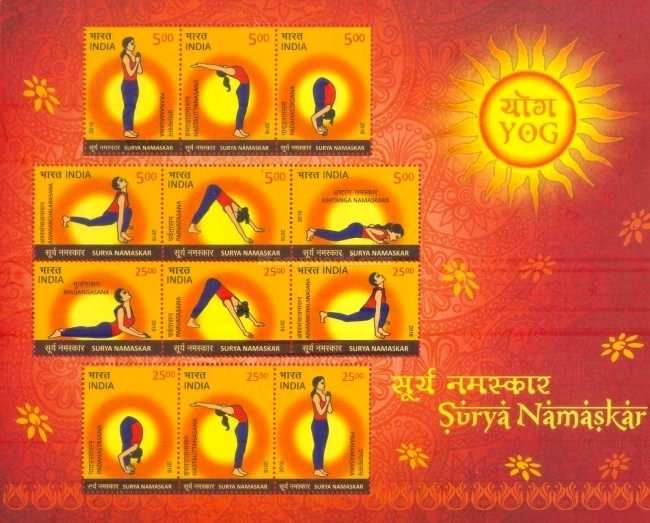
Commemorative sheet of India Post stamps, 2016

=== Energy cost ===
The energy cost of exercise is measured in units of metabolic equivalent of task (MET). Less than 3 METs counts as light exercise; 3 to 6 METs is moderate exercise; 6 or over is vigorous exercise. American College of Sports Medicine and American Heart Association guidelines count periods of at least 10 minutes of moderate MET level activity towards their recommended daily amounts of exercise. For healthy adults aged 18 to 65, the guidelines recommend moderate exercise for 30 minutes five days a week, or vigorous aerobic exercise for 20 minutes three days a week.

The Sun Salutation's energy cost ranges widely according to how energetically it is practised, from a light 2.9 to a vigorous 7.4 METs. The higher end of the range requires transition jumps between the poses. (Note: Haskell, curious about the wide range of METs in Sun Salutation, repeated the study (Mody) which gave the highest value; using "transition jumps, and full pushups", he obtained "agreement" with 6.4 METs.) Practitioners accustomed to this can find performing the sequence an "exhilarating process".

=== Muscle usage ===
A 2014 study indicated that the muscle groups activated by specific asanas varied with the skill of the practitioners, from beginner to instructor. The eleven asanas in the Sun Salutation sequences A and B of Ashtanga Vinyasa Yoga were performed by beginners, advanced practitioners and instructors. The activation of 14 groups of muscles was measured with electrodes on the skin over the muscles. Among the findings, beginners used pectoral muscles more than instructors, whereas instructors used deltoid muscles more than other practitioners, as well as the vastus medialis (which stabilises the knee). The yoga instructor Grace Bullock writes that such patterns of activation suggest that asana practice increases awareness of the body and the patterns in which muscles are engaged, making exercise more beneficial and safer.

== See also ==
- Burpee (exercise)
- Hindu push-up
- Sun worship in Hinduism

== Sources ==
- Alter, Joseph S. (2000). Gandhi's Body: Sex, Diet, and the Politics of Nationalism. University of Pennsylvania Press. ISBN 978-0-812-23556-2.
- ——— (2004). Yoga in Modern India : the Body Between Science and Philosophy. Princeton University Press. ISBN 978-0-691-11874-1. OCLC 53483558.
- Goldberg, Elliott (2016). The Path of Modern Yoga: the History of an Embodied Spiritual Practice. Inner Traditions. ISBN 978-1-62055-567-5. OCLC 926062252.
- Kale, Sunila S.; Novetzke, Christian Lee (2025). The Yoga of Power: Yoga as Political Thought and Practice in India. Columbia University Press. ISBN 978-0-231-54946-2.
- Lidell, Lucy; The Sivananda Yoga Centre (1983). The Book of Yoga: the Complete Step-by-step Guide. Ebury. ISBN 978-0-85223-297-2. OCLC 12457963.
- Mehta, Silva; Mehta, Mira; Mehta, Shyam (1990). Yoga: The Iyengar Way. Dorling Kindersley. ISBN 978-0-86318-420-8.
- Mujumdar, Dattatraya Chintaman, ed. (1950). Encyclopedia of Indian Physical Culture: A Comprehensive Survey of the Physical Education in India, Profusely Illustrating Various Activities of Physical Culture, Games, Exercises, Etc., as Handed over to us from our Fore-fathers and Practised in India. Good Companions.
- Pratinidhi, Pant (1938) [1929]. The Ten-Point Way to Health=Surya Namaskars... Edited with an introduction by Louise Morgan. J. M. Dent.
- Ramaswami, Srivatsa (2005). The Complete Book of Vinyasa Yoga. Da Capo Press. ISBN 978-1-56924-402-9.
- Singleton, Mark (2010). Yoga Body: The Origins of Modern Posture Practice. Oxford University Press. pp. 180–181, 205–206. ISBN 978-0-19-974598-2.
- Sjoman, Norman E. (1999) [1996]. The Yoga Tradition of the Mysore Palace (2nd ed.). Abhinav Publications. ISBN 81-7017-389-2.
- Vishnudevananda (1988) [1960]. The Complete Illustrated Book of Yoga. New York: Three Rivers Press/Random House. ISBN 0-517-88431-3. OCLC 32442598.
