= Ashtanga Namaskara =

Yoga posture

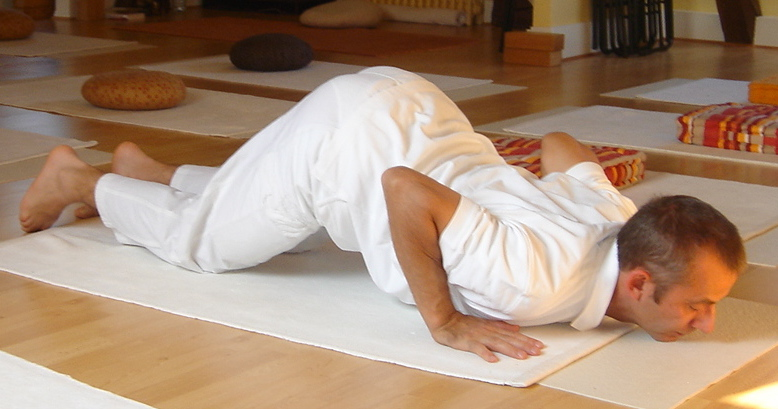
Ashtanga Namaskara

Ashtanga Namaskara (Sanskrit: अष्टाङ्ग नमस्कार), Ashtanga Dandavat Pranam (अष्टाङ्ग दण्डवत् प्रणाम्), Eight Limbed pose, Caterpillar pose, or Chest, Knees and Chin pose is an asana sometimes used in the Surya Namaskar sequence in modern yoga as exercise, where the body is balanced on eight points of contact with the floor: feet, knees, chest, chin and hands.

== Etymology and origins ==
The name comes from the Sanskrit words अष्ट asht, eight, अङ्ग anga, limb, and नमस्कार namaskar, bowing or greeting.

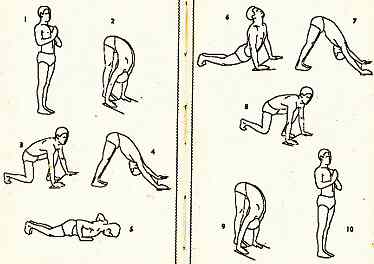
Pant Pratinidhi's 1928 guide to Surya Namaskar, not at that time considered to be yoga, used Ashtanga Namaskara (with forehead on ground) as its fifth step (lower left).

The asana is unknown in medieval hatha yoga. It forms part of Pant Pratinidhi's 1929 Surya Namaskar exercise sequence, not then considered to be yoga. The yoga scholar Mark Singleton argues that the postures forming the sequence of Surya Namaskar derive from the Indian gymnastic exercises called dands (dand meaning a stick or staff). He notes that in the Bombay Physical Education syllabus of 1940, Surya Namaskar is named Ashtang Dand, he supposes from this central posture, Ashtanga Namaskara. Singleton suggests further that this also gave its name to Krishnamacharya's and later his pupil K. Pattabhi Jois's system of Ashtanga Yoga, rather than supposing that the name of the system somehow came from the 2,000 year old Ashtanga, the Eight Limbs of Patanjali's system of yoga.

== Description ==
Ashtanga Namaskara is a prone posture with eight parts of the body in contact with the ground: both feet, both knees, both hands, the chest, and either the chin or the forehead. The hands are below the shoulders, the elbows bent.

Pant Pratinidhi's original description of the pose is:

Keeping hands rooted, drop flat on the floor, touching forehead, nose, chest, knees, toes, but not the hips or abdomen. Try to press the chin in and down against the collar-bone. ... The chief aim of Position Five is to lift the abdomen and hips as high off the floor as possible.

The pose has been used as an alternative to Chaturanga Dandasana in the Surya Namaskar sequence, considered suitable for practitioners lacking the strength to do the usual pose; arguments against this usage include compression of the lower back and stress on the shoulder joint. It was used in the early Surya Namaskar of Pant Pratinidhi, with the forehead touching the ground.

== Sources ==
- Lidell, Lucy; The Sivananda Yoga Centre (1983). The Book of Yoga: the complete step-by-step guide. Ebury. ISBN 978-0-85223-297-2. OCLC 12457963.
- Pratinidhi, Pant (1938) [1929]. The Ten-Point Way to Health=Surya Namaskars... Edited with an introduction by Louise Morgan. J. M. Dent.
- Saraswati, Swami Satyananda (1996). Asana Pranayama Mudra Bandha (PDF). Yoga Publications Trust. ISBN 978-81-86336-14-4. Archived from the original (PDF) on 2015-08-07.
- Singleton, Mark (2010). Yoga Body: the origins of modern posture practice. Oxford University Press. ISBN 978-0-19-539534-1. OCLC 318191988.
