= Chaturanga Dandasana =

Reclining posture in modern yoga

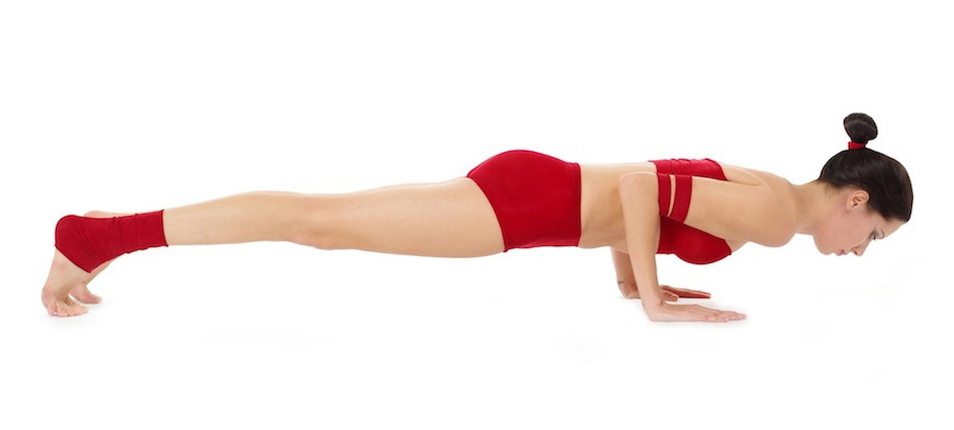
Chaturanga Dandasana or Low Plank

Chaturanga Dandasana (Sanskrit: चतुरङ्ग दण्डासन; IAST: Caturaṅga Daṇḍāsana) or Four-Limbed Staff pose, also known as Low Plank, is an asana in modern yoga as exercise and in some forms of Surya Namaskar (Salute to the Sun), in which a straight body parallel to the ground is supported by the toes and palms, with elbows at a right angle along the body. The variation Kumbhakasana, Phalakasana, or High Plank has the arms straight.

== Etymology and origins ==
The name comes from the Sanskrit: चतुर् IAST: catur, "four"; अङ्ग aṅga, "limb"; दण्ड daṇḍa, "staff"; and आसन; āsana, "posture" or "seat".

The pose was unknown in hatha yoga until the 20th century Light on Yoga, but it appears in the 1896 Vyayama Dipika, a manual of gymnastics, as part of the "very old" sequence of danda exercises. The historian of yoga Norman Sjoman suggests that it is one of the poses adopted into yoga as exercise in Mysore by Krishnamacharya and forming the "primary foundation" for his vinyasas with flowing movements between poses. The pose would then have been taken up by his pupils Pattabhi Jois and B. K. S. Iyengar.

== Description ==
In Chaturanga Dandasana the hands and feet are on the floor, supporting the body, which is parallel to and lowered toward, but not touching, the floor. It looks much like the low position in a push-up, but with the hands quite low (just above the pelvis), and the elbows kept in along the sides of the body.

In Ashtanga (vinyasa) yoga, Chaturanga Daṇḍasana is part of the Surya Namaskar (Salute to the Sun) asana sequence, performed on an exhalation. It is the fourth asana of Surya Namaskar A, and the fourth, eighth and twelfth asanas of Surya Namaskar B.

In Iyengar Yoga, the posture is simply held for a period of time (for instance, 30 seconds) with continuous breathing.

== Variations ==
Beginners can practise with the knees on the floor, or keeping the arms straight (in Kumbhakasana, also called Phalakasana or High Plank), before attempting the full pose. High Plank too is used in some forms of the Sun Salutation.

Purvottanasana, Reverse Plank, or Upward Plank, has the back straight but the front of the body facing upwards, the arms outstretched down to the floor, the fingers pointing towards the feet.

Another variation on Phalakasana, Forearm Plank, has the forearms on the floor, and the body straight as in Low Plank. The hands may be clasped as in Dolphin Pose, or the palms can be placed flat on the floor.

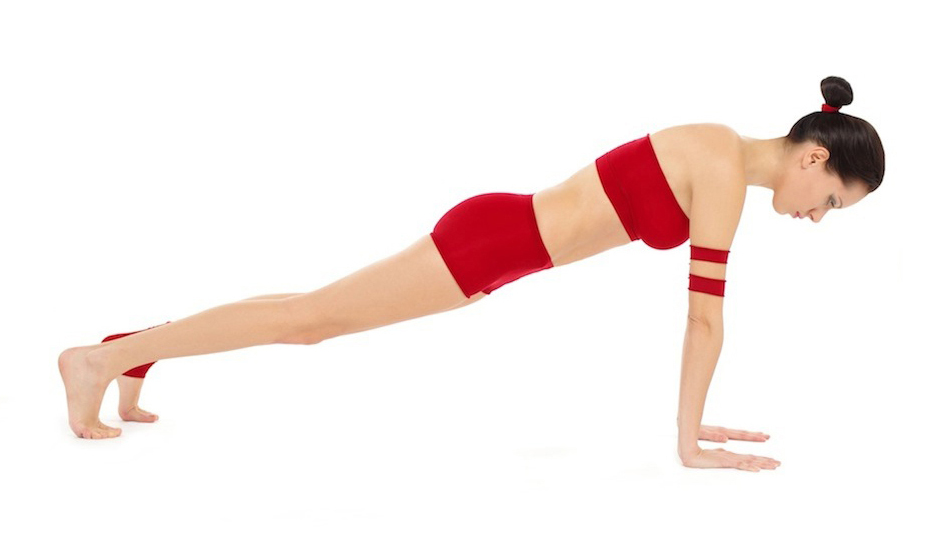
Variation with straight arms (Kumbhakasana, Phalakasana, or High Plank)

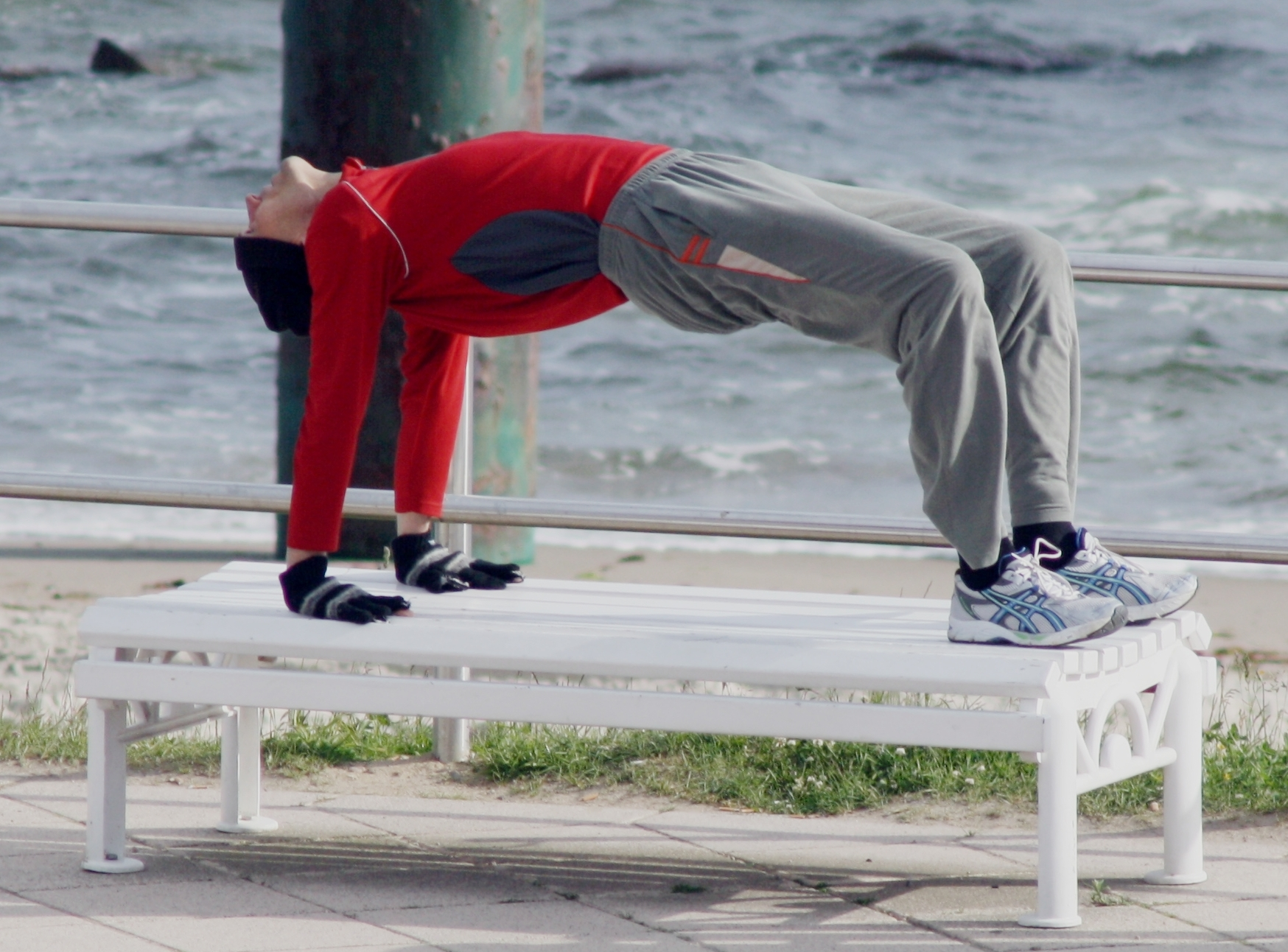
Purvottanasana, Reverse Plank

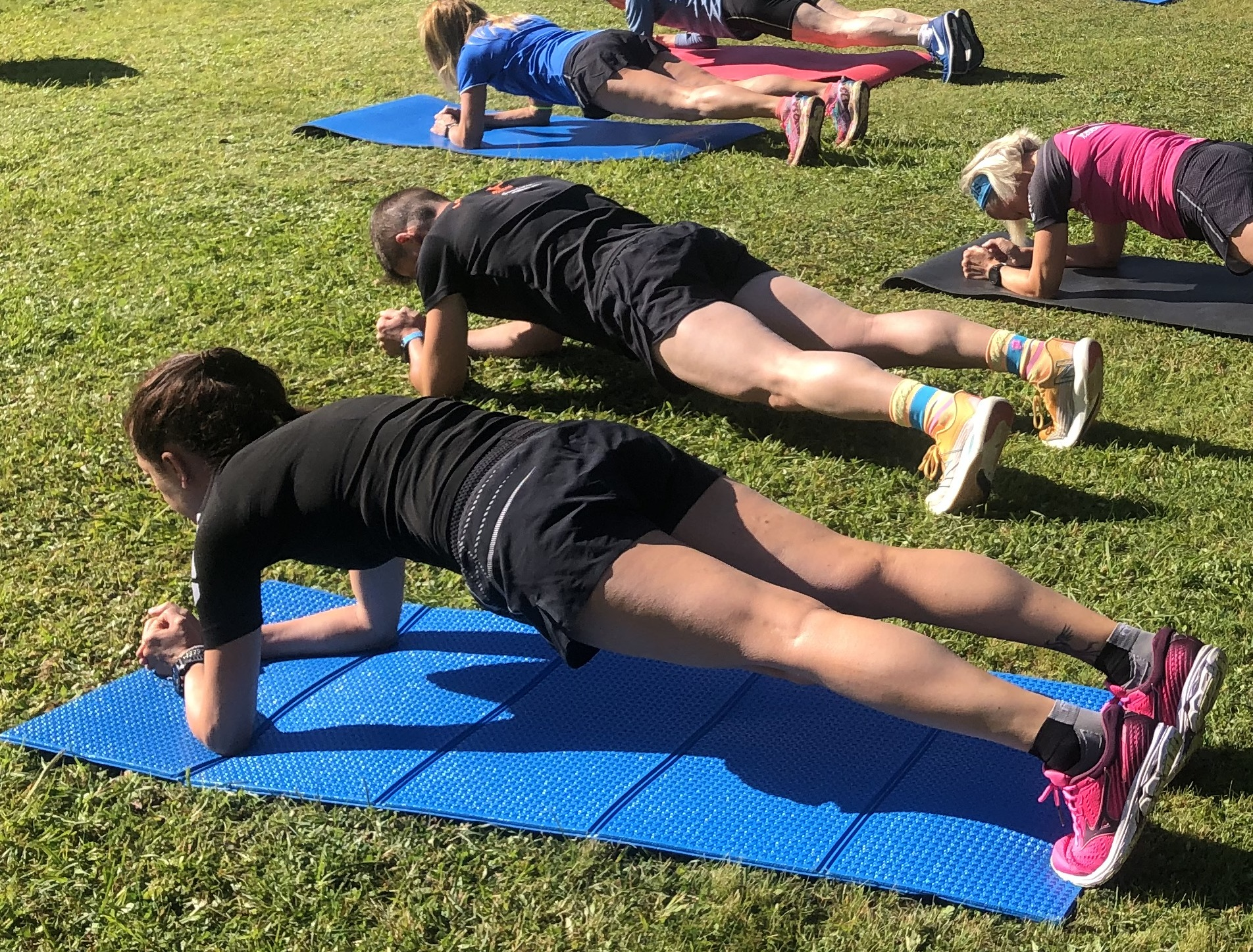
Forearm Plank, Phalakasana variant

== See also ==
- Dolphin Pose – a preparation for Pincha Mayurasana
- List of asanas
- Plank (exercise)
- Vasishtasana – side plank pose
- Ashtanga namaskara

== Sources ==
- Iyengar, B. K. S. (2005). Illustrated Light On Yoga. HarperCollins. ISBN 978-81-7223-606-9.
- Kaminoff, Leslie (2007). Yoga Anatomy. The Breath Trust. ISBN 978-0-7360-6278-7.
