= Standing asanas =

Yoga poses with one or both feet on the ground

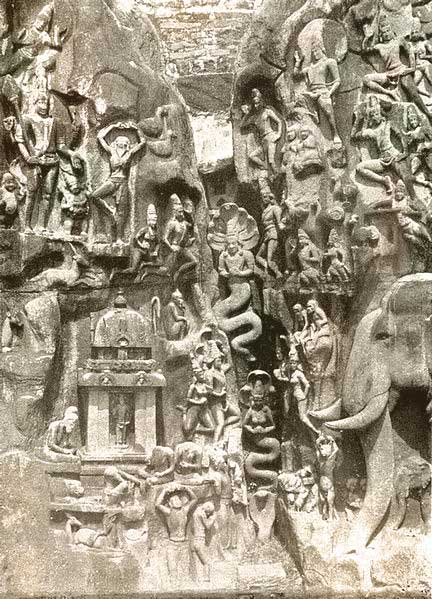
The rock relief "Descent of the Ganges" at Mahabalipuram appears to show a person standing in Vrikshasana (tree pose) at top left. 7th century

The standing asanas are the yoga poses or asanas with one or both feet on the ground, and the body more or less upright. They are among the most distinctive features of modern yoga as exercise. Until the 20th century there were very few of these, the best example being Vrikshasana, Tree Pose. From the time of Krishnamacharya in Mysore, many standing poses have been created. Two major sources of these asanas have been identified: the exercise sequence Surya Namaskar (the salute to the sun); and the gymnastics widely practised in India at the time, based on the prevailing physical culture.

The origin of standing asanas has been controversial since Mark Singleton argued in 2010 that some forms of modern yoga represent a radical reworking of hatha yoga, in particular by adding standing asanas and transitions (vinyasas) between them, and by suppressing most non-postural aspects of yoga, rather than a smooth continuation of ancient traditions. These changes enabled yoga to be practised as a flowing sequence of movements rather than as static poses, and in turn this allowed sessions to focus on aerobic exercise.

== Context ==
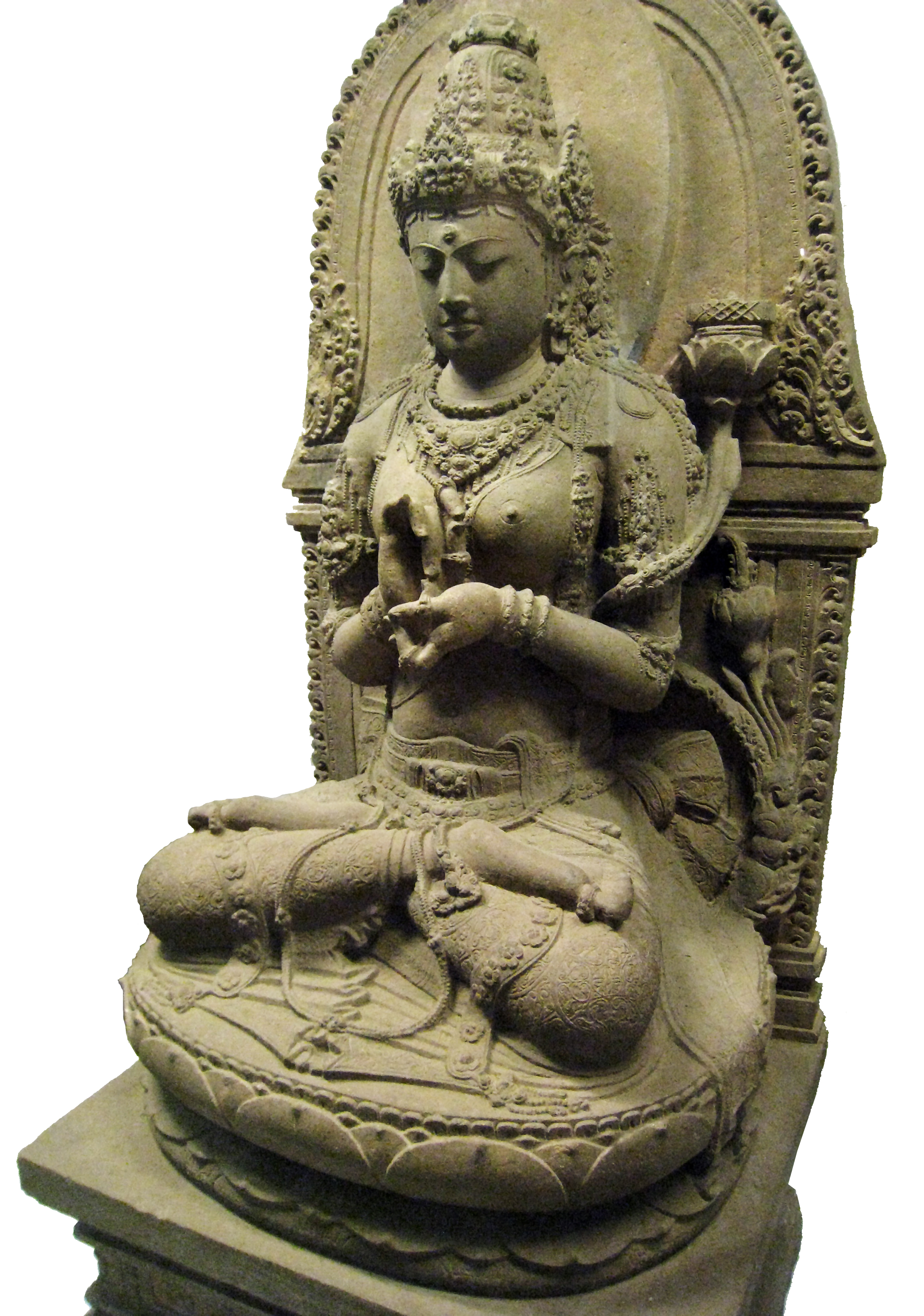
Prajnaparamita seated in Padmasana for meditation, Java. 13th century

Yoga is a group of physical, mental, and spiritual practices or disciplines which originated in ancient India. Its spiritual and philosophical goal was to unite the human spirit with the Divine; its practices were mainly meditative. The branch of yoga that makes use of physical postures in addition to other practices such as meditation and purifications is hatha yoga; it flourished from the 11th century. The term "Yoga" in the Western world often denotes a modern form of hatha yoga, yoga as exercise, consisting largely of the postures called asanas. The earliest asanas were cross-legged meditation seats; other postures were gradually added.

== In hatha yoga ==
Among the few standing poses definitely practised in hatha yoga before the 20th century is Vrikshasana, tree pose. It is described in the 17th century hatha yoga text Gheraṇḍa Saṃhitā 2.36. It may be far older than that; a 7th-century stone carving in Mahabalipuram appears to contain a figure standing on one leg, perhaps indicating that a pose similar to Vrikshasana was in use at that time. It is said that sadhus disciplined themselves by choosing to meditate in the pose.

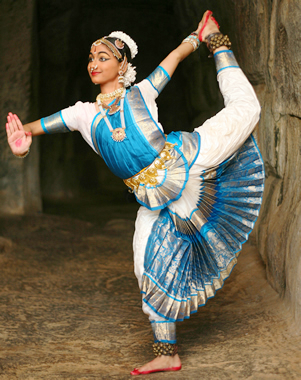
Natarajasana in Bharatanatyam classical Indian dance: the pose was not considered yoga until the 20th century.

Some other standing poses have been suspected of having medieval origins, without reliable evidence. One difficulty is naming; the existence of a medieval pose with the name of a current standing pose is not proof that the two are the same, as the names given to poses may change, and the same name may be used for different poses. For example, the name Garudasana, Eagle Pose, is used for a sitting pose in the Gheraṇḍa Saṃhitā, 2.37. The name Garudasana is given to a pose close to Vrikshasana in the 19th century Sritattvanidhi; the modern standing pose named Garudasana is not seen until the 20th century.

Another issue is the use that is made of a pose; the existence of a pose in medieval times is not proof that it was used in hatha yoga. For example, Natarajasana, the pose of Dancing Shiva, is depicted in 13th - 18th century Bharatnatyam dance statues of the Eastern Gopuram, Nataraja Temple, Chidambaram, implying, according to Ananda Bhavanani, that the pose was used in medieval hatha yoga and that there was a cultural interchange between yoga and dance. However, Elliott Goldberg observes that Natarajasana is not found in any medieval hatha yoga text, nor is it mentioned by any pre-20th century traveller to India, nor is it found in artistic depictions of yoga such as the Sritattvanidhi or the Mahamandir near Jodhpur. Goldberg argues that the pose was among the many introduced into modern yoga by Krishnamacharya in the early 20th century, and taken up by his pupils such as B. K. S. Iyengar, who made the pose a signature of modern yoga.

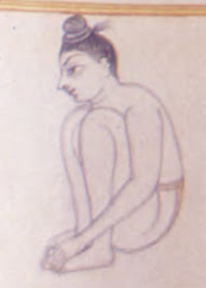
Utkatasana shown as a low squatting pose in the 19th century Sritattvanidhi in Mysore Palace; the modern pose is a standing squat.

Another case is Utkatasana, sometimes called chair pose, though its name, Utkata, means "fierce". In modern yoga, it is indeed a challenging squatting pose with the thighs approaching the horizontal, whereas in the 19th century Sritattvanidhi it is illustrated as a low squatting pose with the buttocks resting against the heels; the Gheraṇḍa Saṃhitā 2.27 is similar, but the heels are raised.

== In yoga as exercise ==
Standing asanas such as Adho Mukha Svanasana (Downward Dog), Virabhadrasana (Warrior Pose) and Trikonasana (Triangle Pose) are a conspicuous feature of the yoga practised around the modern world. Nearly all the standing poses now practised were unknown in hatha yoga until the 20th century. Many are described in Iyengar's 1966 Light on Yoga. Some, such as Tadasana, appear in the 1896 Vyayama Dipika, a manual of gymnastics, as part of the "very old" sequence of danda (Sanskrit for "staff" or "stick") exercises. Norman Sjoman suggests that it is one of the poses adopted into yoga in Mysore by Krishnamacharya and forming the "primary foundation" for his vinyasas, the flowing movements between poses. The pose would then have been taken up by his pupils Pattabhi Jois and Iyengar.

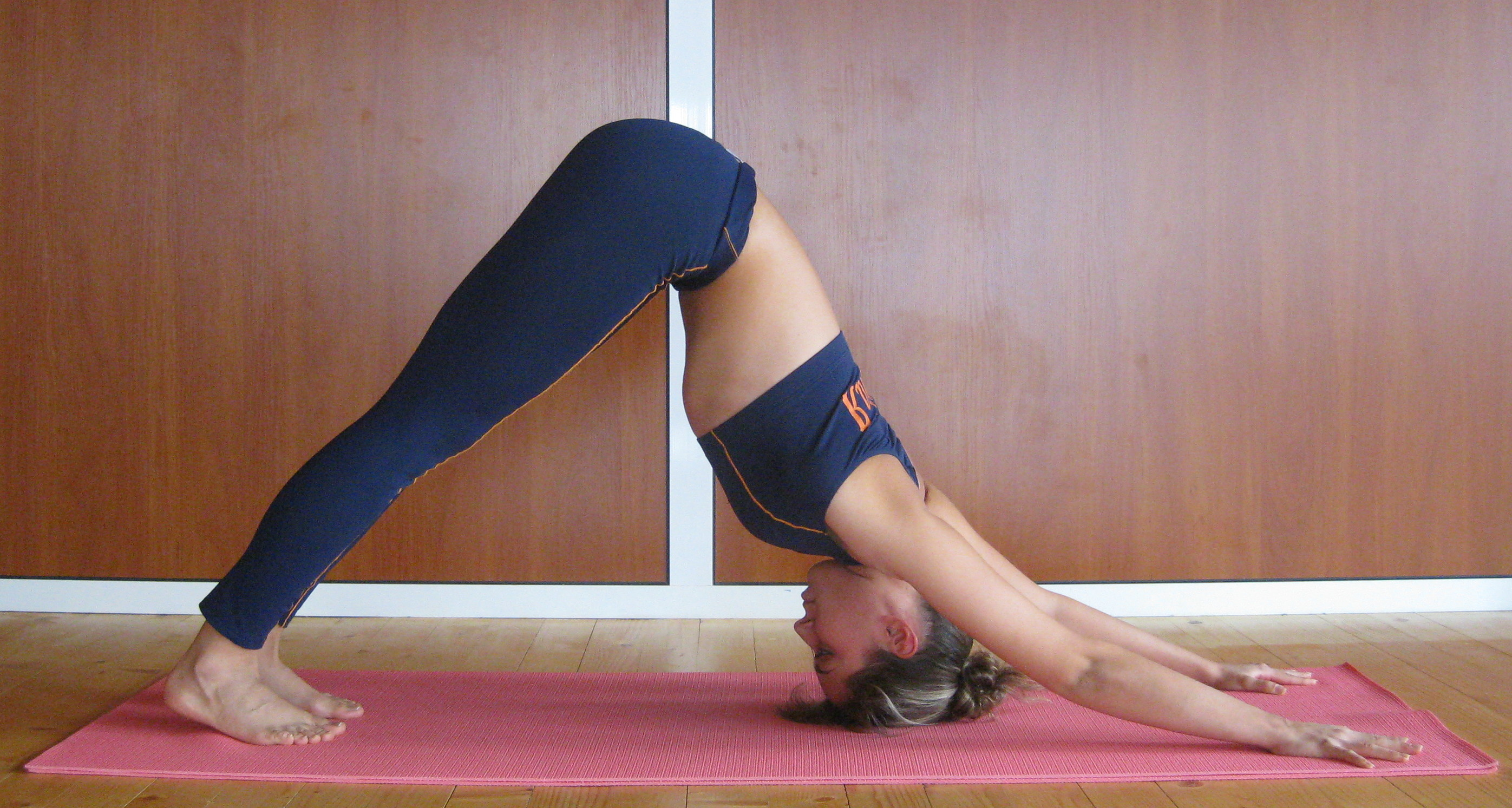
Downward Dog is one of the most widely-recognised asanas.

In 1924, Swami Kuvalayananda founded the Kaivalyadhama Health and Yoga Research Center in Maharashtra. He and his rival Yogendra began to combine asanas with Indian systems of exercise and modern European gymnastics, having according to the scholar Joseph Alter a "profound" effect on the evolution of yoga. Krishnamacharya, known as the father of modern yoga, studied under Kuvalayananda in the 1930s and created in his Mysore yogashala "a marriage of hatha yoga, wrestling exercises, and modern Western gymnastic movement, and unlike anything seen before in the yoga tradition." Norman Sjoman argues that Krishnamacharya drew on the Vyayama Dipika gymnastic exercise manual to create the Mysore Palace system of yoga. Sjoman further observes that whereas many traditional asanas are named for objects (like Padmasana, lotus pose), legendary figures (like Matsyendrasana, the sage Matsyendra's pose), or animals (like Kurmasana, tortoise pose), many of Iyengar's asanas have names that simply describe the body's position (like Utthita Parsvakonasana, "Extended Side Angle Pose"); these are, he suggests, the ones developed in the 20th century. The yoga scholar Mark Singleton argues that Krishnamacharya was familiar with the physical culture of his time, which was influenced by Scandinavian gymnastics such as the system of Niels Bukh; (Note: Niels Bukh's Primary Gymnastics includes standing poses close to (among others) Adho Mukha Svanasana (p. 36), Prasarita Padottasana (p. 141), Parsvottanasana (p. 86), Tadasana (p. 28), and Uttanasana (p. 44).) Krishnamacharya's experimentation with asanas and his innovative use of gymnastic jumping between poses may well explain, Singleton suggests, the resemblances between modern standing asanas and Scandinavian gymnastics.

The origin of standing asanas has been controversial since Singleton's 2010 book Yoga Body argued that some forms of modern yoga represent a radical reworking of hatha yoga, in particular by adding standing asanas and transitions (vinyasas) between them, and by suppressing most non-postural aspects of yoga, rather than a smooth continuation of ancient traditions. The addition of vinyasas enabled sequences consisting mainly of standing asanas to be practised in a continuous flow. Such a sequence could be performed quickly if desired, making for aerobic exercise, possibly at the expense of a more meditative practice.

Some standing asanas with origins and dates
Asana	English	Described by	Date	Image
Vrikshasana	Tree pose	Gheraṇḍa Saṃhitā	17th C.	
Garudasana	Eagle pose	Sritattvanidhi	19th C.	
Parsvakonasana	Side angle pose	Light on Yoga (Note: This is not to say that these poses were invented by Iyengar. Sjoman suggests that they most probably came from Krishnamacharya.)	20th C.	
Trikonasana	Triangle pose	Light on Yoga	20th C.	
Utkatasana	Chair pose	Light on Yoga	20th C.	
Ardha Chandrasana	Half moon pose	Light on Yoga	20th C.	
Viparita Virabhadrasana	Reversed warrior pose	Yoga Journal	21st C.	

== Surya Namaskar ==
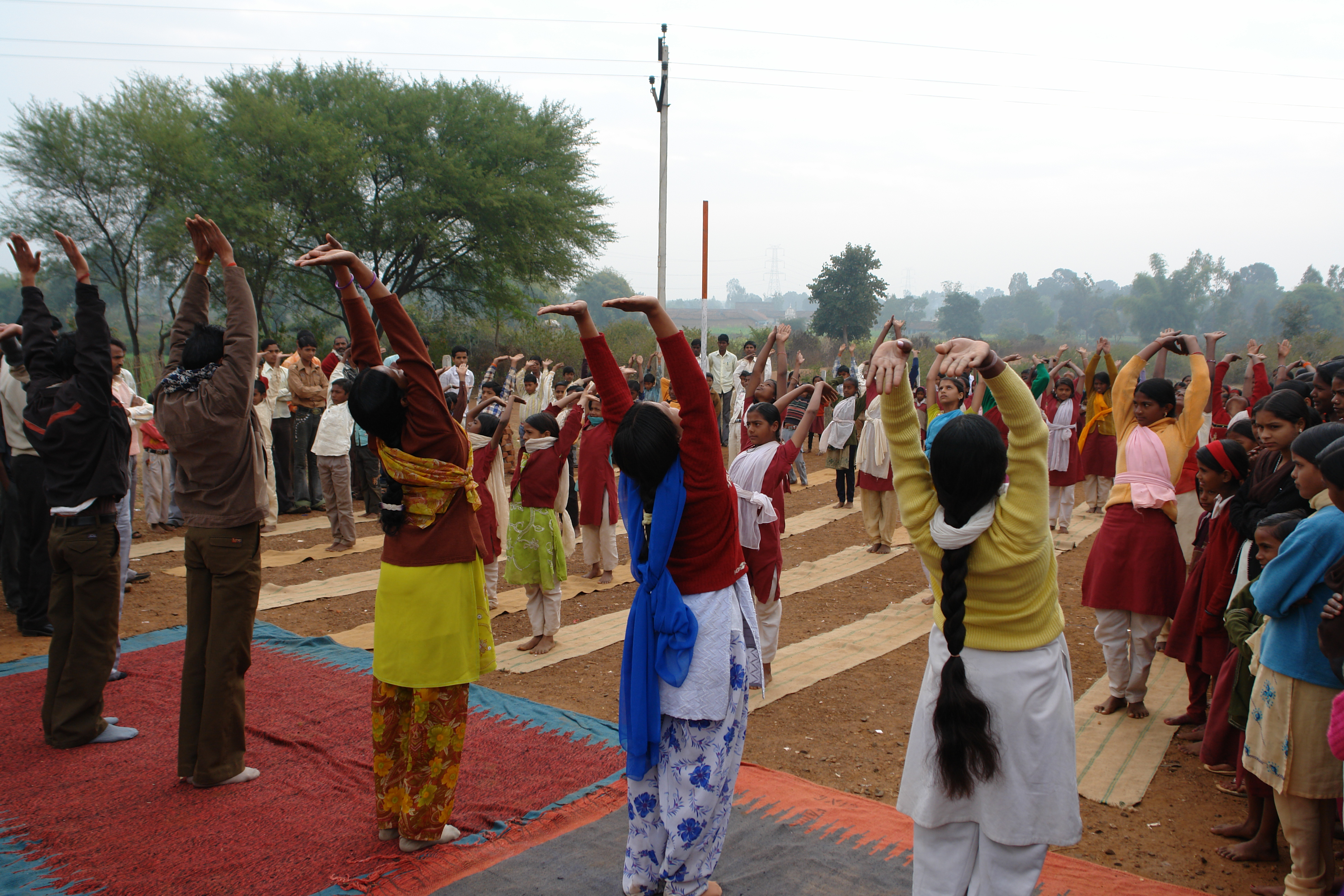
Surya Namaskar, the salute to the sun, was taught as exercise and not as yoga in the 1930s, before it was incorporated into modern yoga as exercise.

Surya Namaskar is a major source of standing asanas. In its modern form, it was created and popularised by the Rajah of Aundh, Bhawanrao Shriniwasrao Pant Pratinidhi, early in the 20th century. It was offered as a separate practice (not then described as yoga) from Krishnamacharya's yoga, and taught in the next-door hall of the Mysore Palace.

Surya Namaskar was not recorded in any Haṭha yoga text before the 19th century. Its standing poses, integral to modern international yoga as exercise and the vinyasas used in some styles to transition between the asanas of Surya Namaskar, vary somewhat between schools. In Iyengar Yoga, other poses can be inserted into the basic sequence. In Ashtanga Vinyasa Yoga, the basic sequence incorporates the lunging Anjaneyasana and the sitting pose Dandasana.

== Sources ==
- Alter, Joseph (2004). Yoga in Modern India: the body between science and philosophy. Princeton University Press. ISBN 978-0-691-11874-1.
- Bharadwaj, S. (1896). Vyayama Dipika, Elements of Gymnastic Exercises, Indian System. Bangalore: Caxton Press. (no OCLC)
- Bukh, Niels (2010) [1924]. Primary Gymnastics. Tufts Press. ISBN 978-1446527351.
- Iyengar, B. K. S. (1991) [1966]. Light on Yoga. London: Thorsons. ISBN 978-0-00-714516-4.
- Mallinson, James (2011). Knut A. Jacobsen; et al. (eds.). Haṭha Yoga in the Brill Encyclopedia of Hinduism. Vol. 3. Brill Academic. pp. 770–781. ISBN 978-90-04-27128-9.
- Mehta, Silva; Mehta, Mira; Mehta, Shyam (1990). Yoga: The Iyengar Way. Dorling Kindersley. ISBN 978-0863184208.
- Singleton, Mark (2010). Yoga Body : the origins of modern posture practice. Oxford University Press. ISBN 978-0-19-539534-1.
- Sjoman, Norman E. (1999). The Yoga Tradition of the Mysore Palace. Abhinav Publications. ISBN 81-7017-389-2.
