= Virabhadrasana =

Standing lunging posture in modern yoga

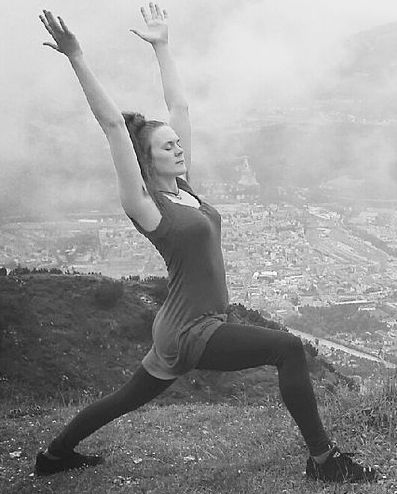
Virabhadrasana I or Warrior Pose I

Virabhadrasana (Sanskrit: वीरभद्रासन; IAST: vīrabhadrāsana) or Warrior Pose is a group of related lunging standing asanas in modern yoga as exercise commemorating the exploits of a mythical warrior, Virabhadra. The name of the pose derives from the Hindu myth, but the pose is not recorded in the hatha yoga tradition until the 20th century. Virabhadrasana has some similarity with poses in the gymnastics of Niels Bukh the early 20th century; it has been suggested that it was adopted into yoga from the tradition of physical culture in India at that time, which was influenced by European gymnastics.

Virabhadrasana has been described as one of the most iconic poses in yoga.

== Etymology and origins ==
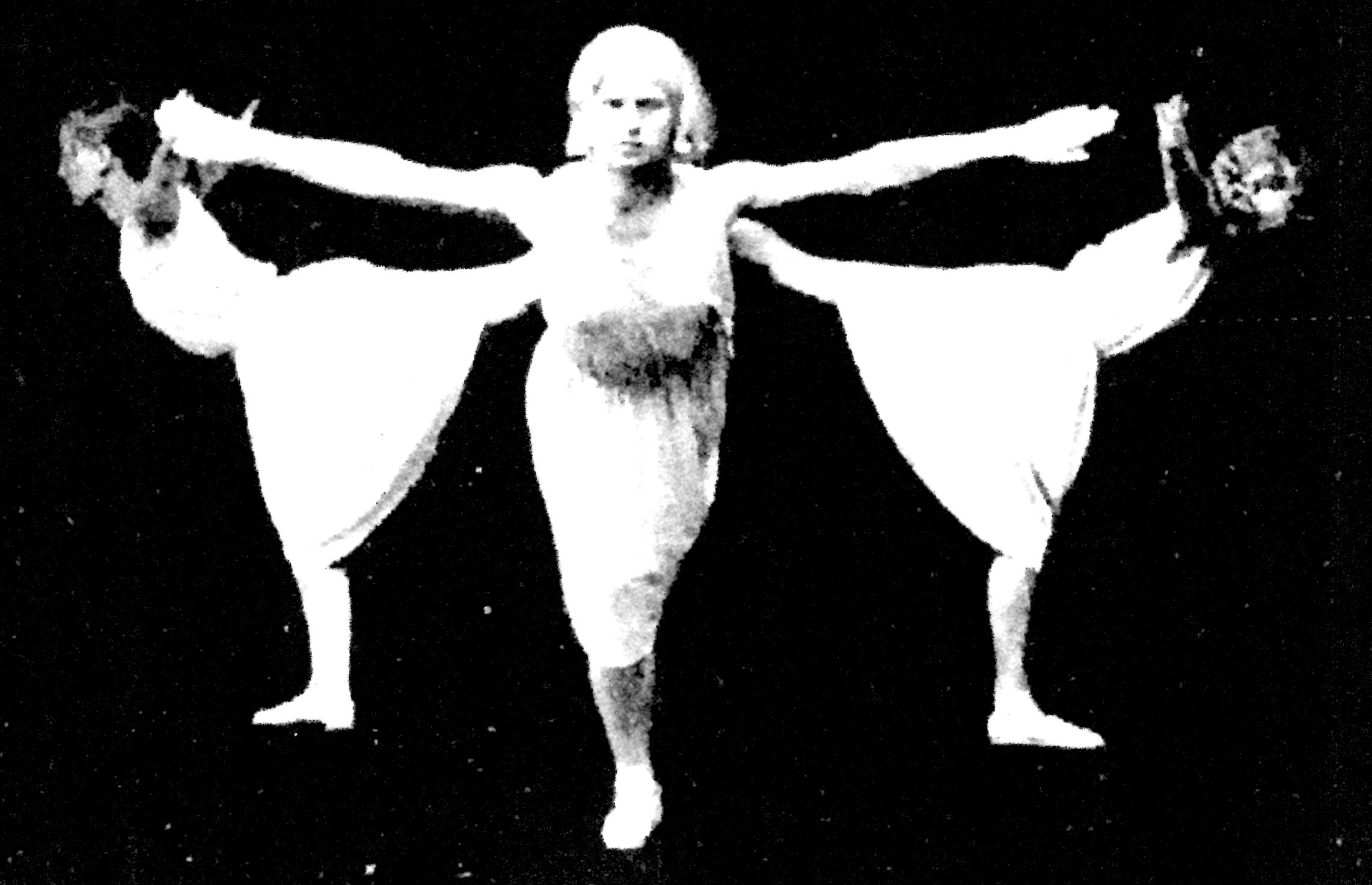
Pose like Virabhadrasana III, variant with arms out to sides, Niels Bukh's Primary Gymnastics, 1924

The name is from the Sanskrit वीरभद्र Vīrabhadra, a mythical warrior, and आसन āsana, a yoga posture or meditation seat. Accordingly the asana is often called "Warrior Pose" in English. Ancient cave rock sculptures in the Ellora Caves, specifically cave 16 and cave 29, show a warrior-Shiva figure in a pose somewhat resembling Virabhadrāsana while conquering demons or wooing his consort Parvati. Still, these poses are not attested in the hatha yoga tradition until the 20th century with the practices of Tirumalai Krishnamacharya and his student Pattabhi Jois, who was photographed in Warrior I in about 1939.

Poses close to Virabhadrasana were described independently of yoga in a European source early in the 20th century, namely in Niels Bukh's 1924 Danish text Grundgymnastik eller primitiv gymnastik (known in English as Primary Gymnastics). Bukh's poses were derived from a 19th century Scandinavian tradition of gymnastics dating back to Pehr Ling, and "found their way to India" by the early 20th century. Mark Singleton suggests that these standing poses in 20th century India were most likely influenced by the tradition of physical culture including Bukh-style gymnastics.

=== Mythology ===
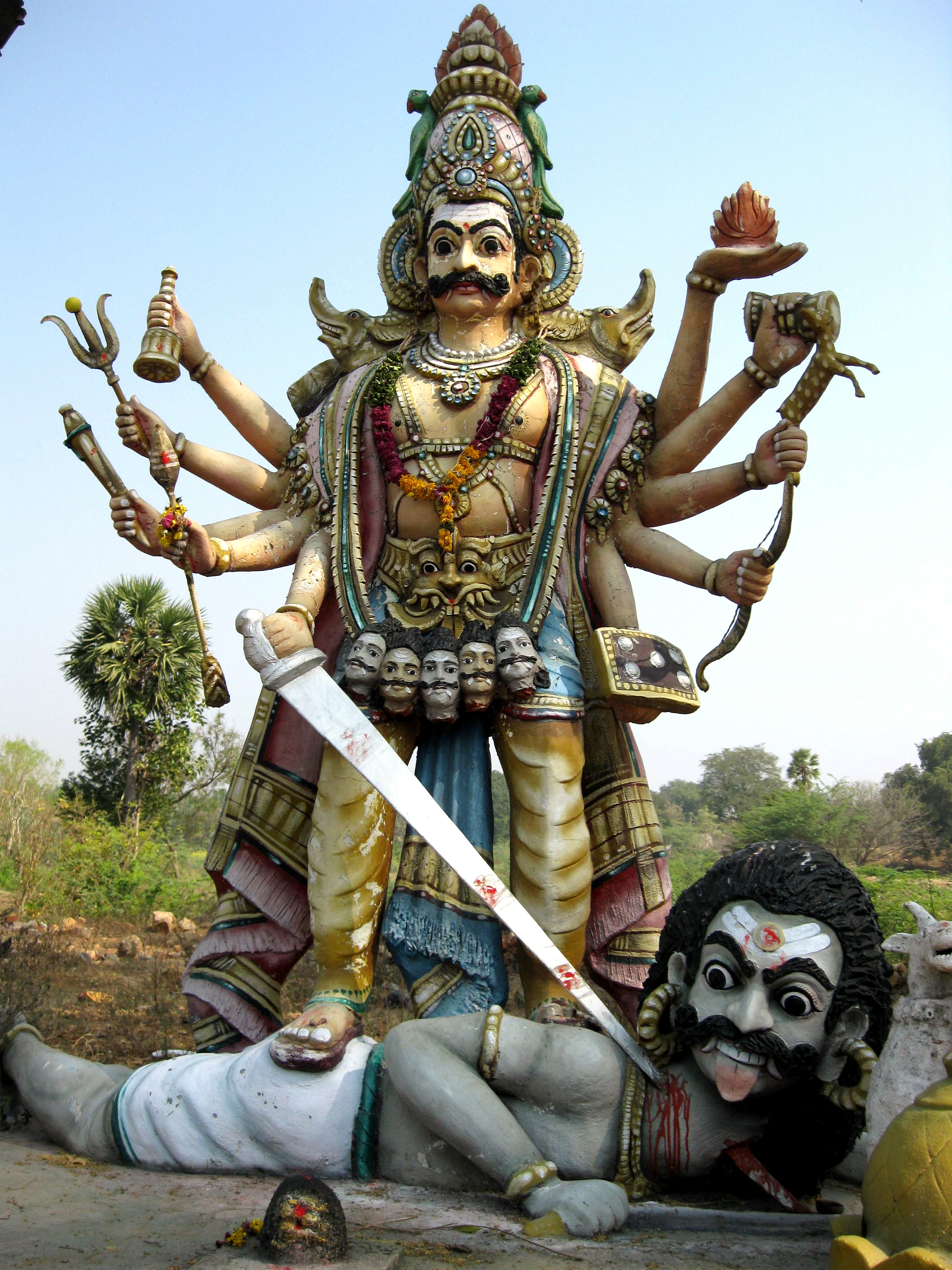
The mythical warrior Virabhadra, his many arms symbolising his powers

One version of the myth of Virabhadra is that the powerful priest Daksha made a great yagna (ritual sacrifice) but did not invite his youngest daughter Sati and her husband Shiva, the supreme ruler of the universe. Sati found out and decided to go alone to the yagna. When she arrived, Sati entered into an argument with her father. Unable to withstand his insults, she spoke a vow to her father, "Since it was you who gave me this body, I no longer wish to be associated with it." She walked to the fire and threw herself in. When Shiva heard of Sati's death, he was devastated. He pulled out a lock of his hair and beat it into the ground, where up rose a powerful Warrior. Shiva named this warrior Virabhadra and ordered him to go to the yagna and destroy Daksha and all his guests.

- Virabhadra's first aspect, Virabhadrasana I, is his arrival, with swords in both hands, thrusting his way up through the earth from below.
- In his second aspect, Virabhadrasana II, he sights his opponent, Daksha.
- And in his third aspect, Virabhadrasana III, moving swiftly and precisely, he decapitates Daksha with his sword.

Shiva then arrives at the yagna and sees the rout that Virabhadra had wrought. Shiva absorbs Virabhadra back into his own form and then transforms into Hara, the ravisher. Filled with sorrow and compassion, Shiva finds Daksha's body and gives it the head of a goat, which brings him back to life. In the end Sati is also reborn.

== Description ==
The poses can be entered from a standing position, Tadasana, jumping or stepping the feet wide apart. For Virabhadrasana I, the hips are turned to face the front foot, which is turned fully outwards; the back foot is turned halfway inwards. The body sinks down into a lunge until the front knee is bent to a right angle, the back leg remaining straight, and the back foot working to keep the whole of the sole of the foot on the floor. The arms are stretched straight upwards, the back is slightly arched, and the gaze is directed upwards.

For Virabhadrasana II, starting from Tadasana, the feet are spread wide, the front foot is turned fully out, and the back foot is turned in very slightly. The body remains facing forwards, so the hips remain in line with the feet, the body sinks down into a lunge until the front knee is bent at a right angle, and the arms are extended fully with the palms down, at shoulder level. The gaze is directed straight forward over the front hand.

For Virabhadrasana III, a more difficult pose requiring strength and balance, again starting from Tadasana, the feet are arranged as for Virabhadrasana I. The trunk is turned fully to face the front foot, with the arms extended straight forwards, the gaze straight forwards, the trunk horizontal and one leg stretched back and also horizontal.

It is possible to enter Vīrabhadrasana using vinyasas starting from Adho Mukha Shvanasana or from Tadasana.

Virabhadrasana has been called "easily one of the most iconic and recognizable postures" in yoga as exercise, as well as "one of the most foundational" and most widely practised.

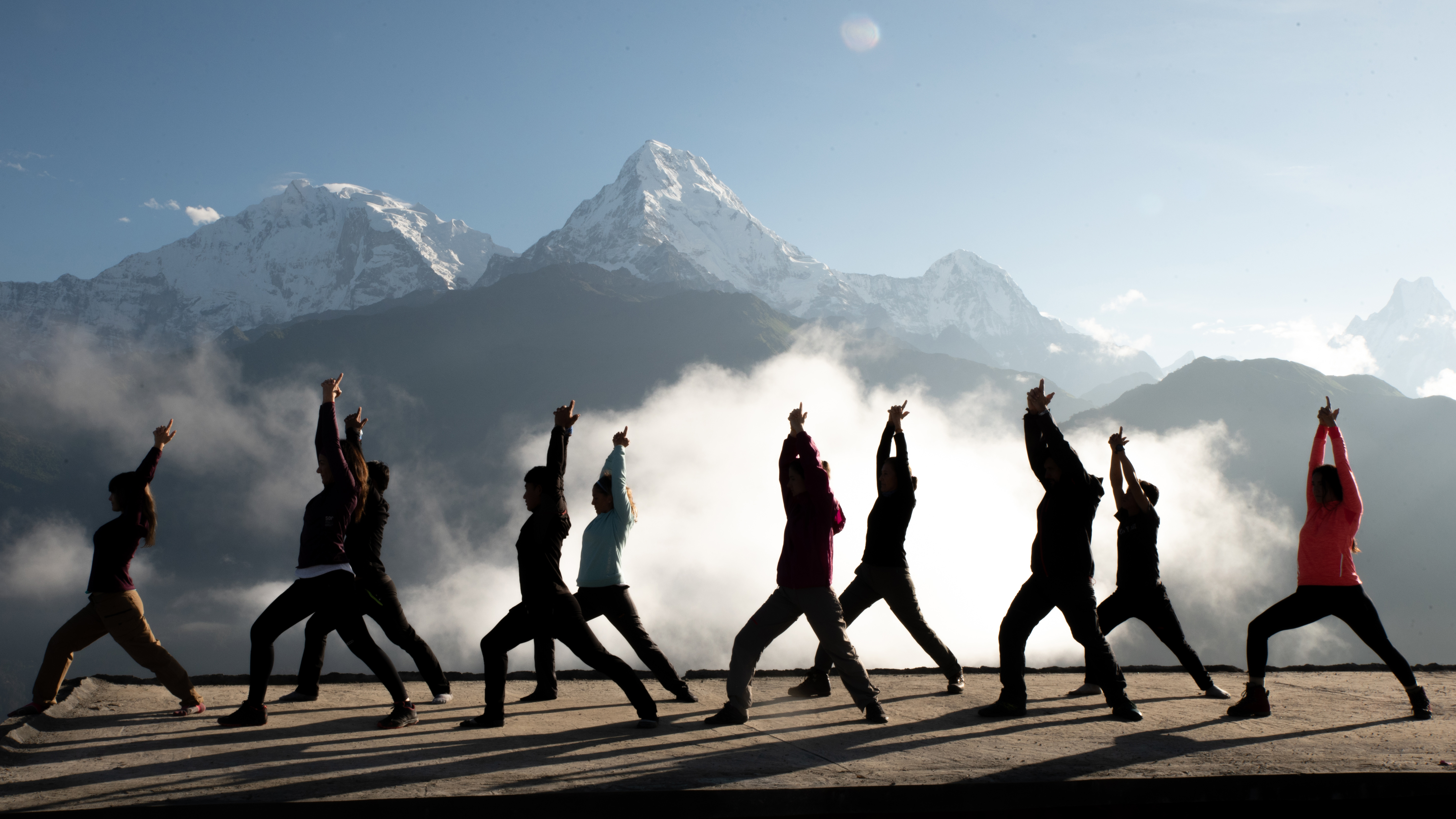
Virabhadrasana I class in Nepal

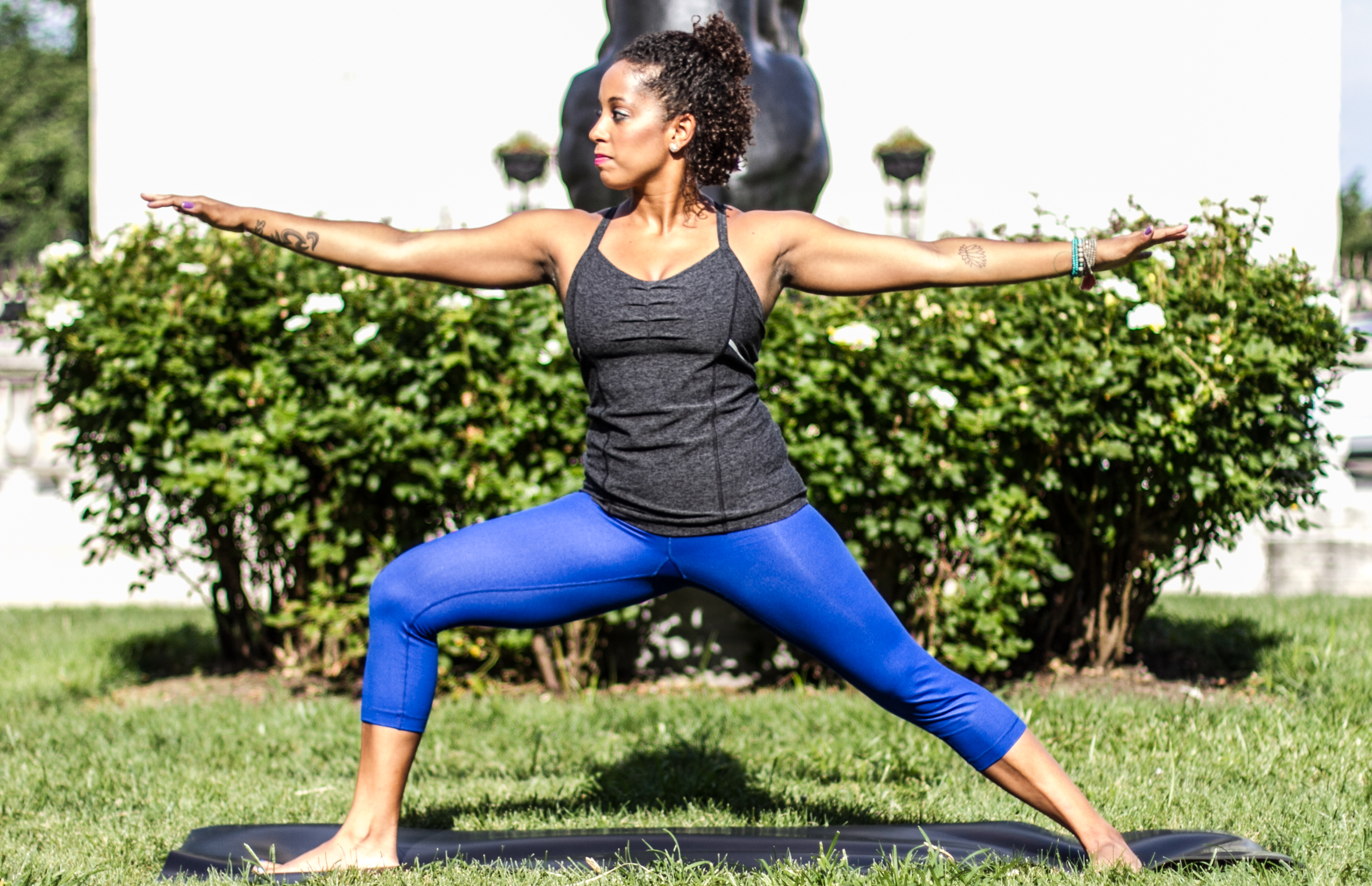
Virabhadrasana II

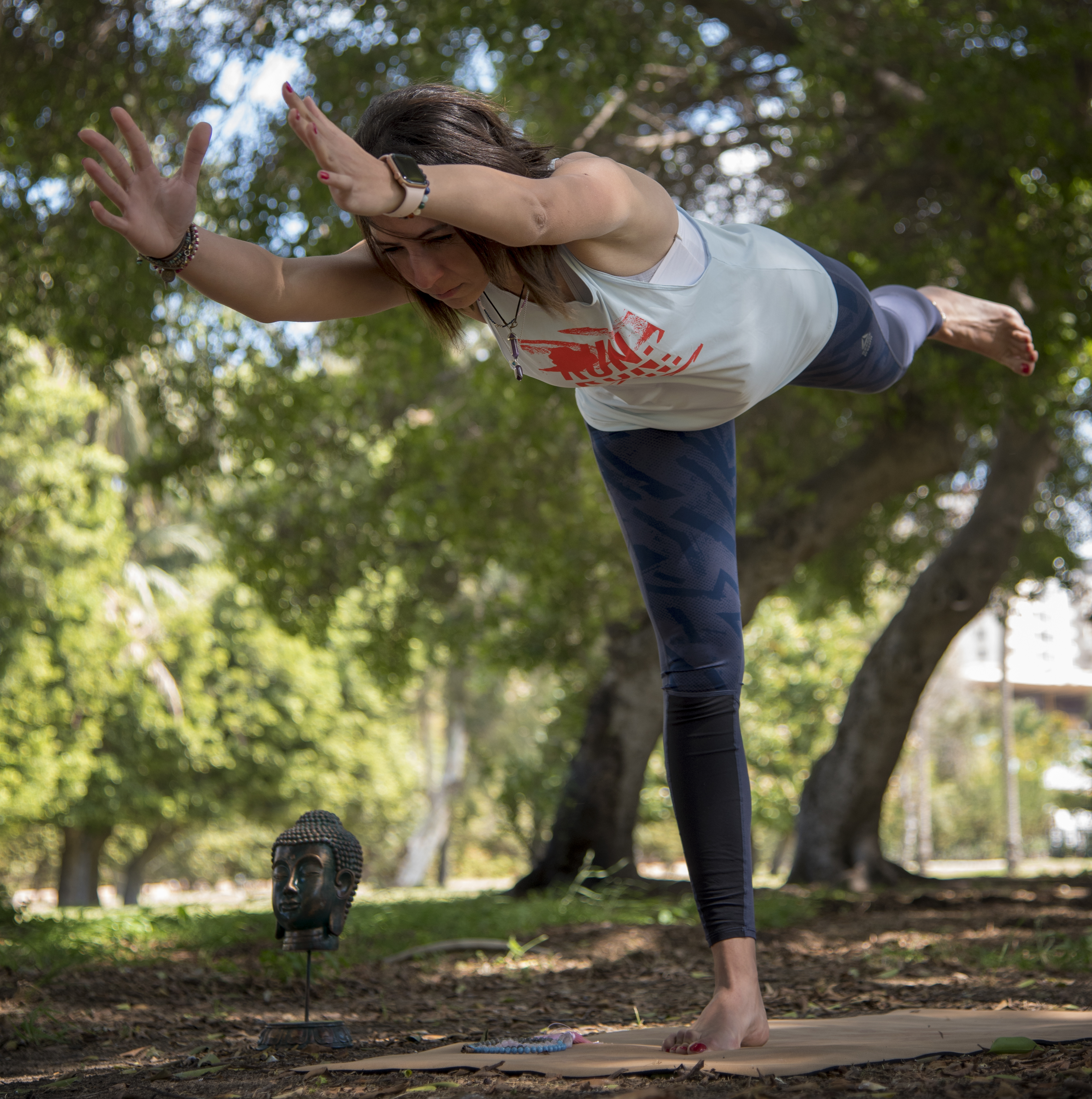
Virabhadrasana III

== Variations ==
Baddha Virabhadrasana, Humble Warrior Pose (Sanskrit बद्ध Baddha, "bound") is a variant of Virabhadrasana I, with the body bent down low over the front leg, and the arms raised vertically above the back, the fingers interlaced.

Viparita Virabhadrasana, Reverse Warrior Pose (Sanskrit विपरीत viparīta, "reversed"), is a variant of Virabhadrasana II, with the upper body and forward arm tilted backwards. The lower arm may be stretched down the rear leg, or it may reach round the back to the opposite hip. The pose is not found in B. K. S. Iyengar's 1966 textbook Light on Yoga, and may have been created as recently as the start of the 21st century.

The arm position in Virabhadrasana III can be varied; the arms may be held straight out to the sides, or straight back along the sides of the body, or the hands may be held in prayer position close to the chest. This pose can be modified to include the support of blocks. This pose can help build balance and strength.

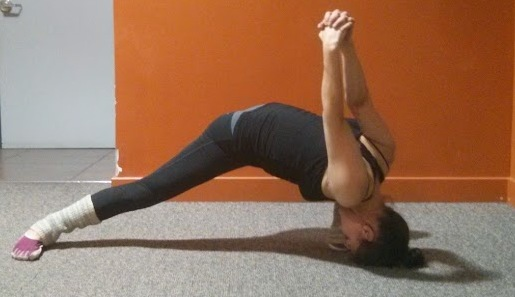
Humble Warrior Pose, Baddha Virabhadrasana, a variant of Virabhadrasana I

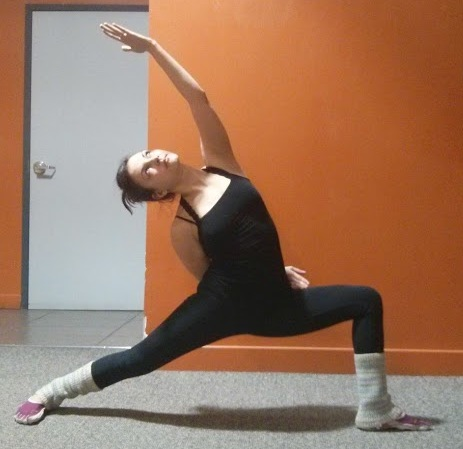
Reverse Warrior Pose, Viparita Virabhadrasana, a modern variant of Virabhadrasana II

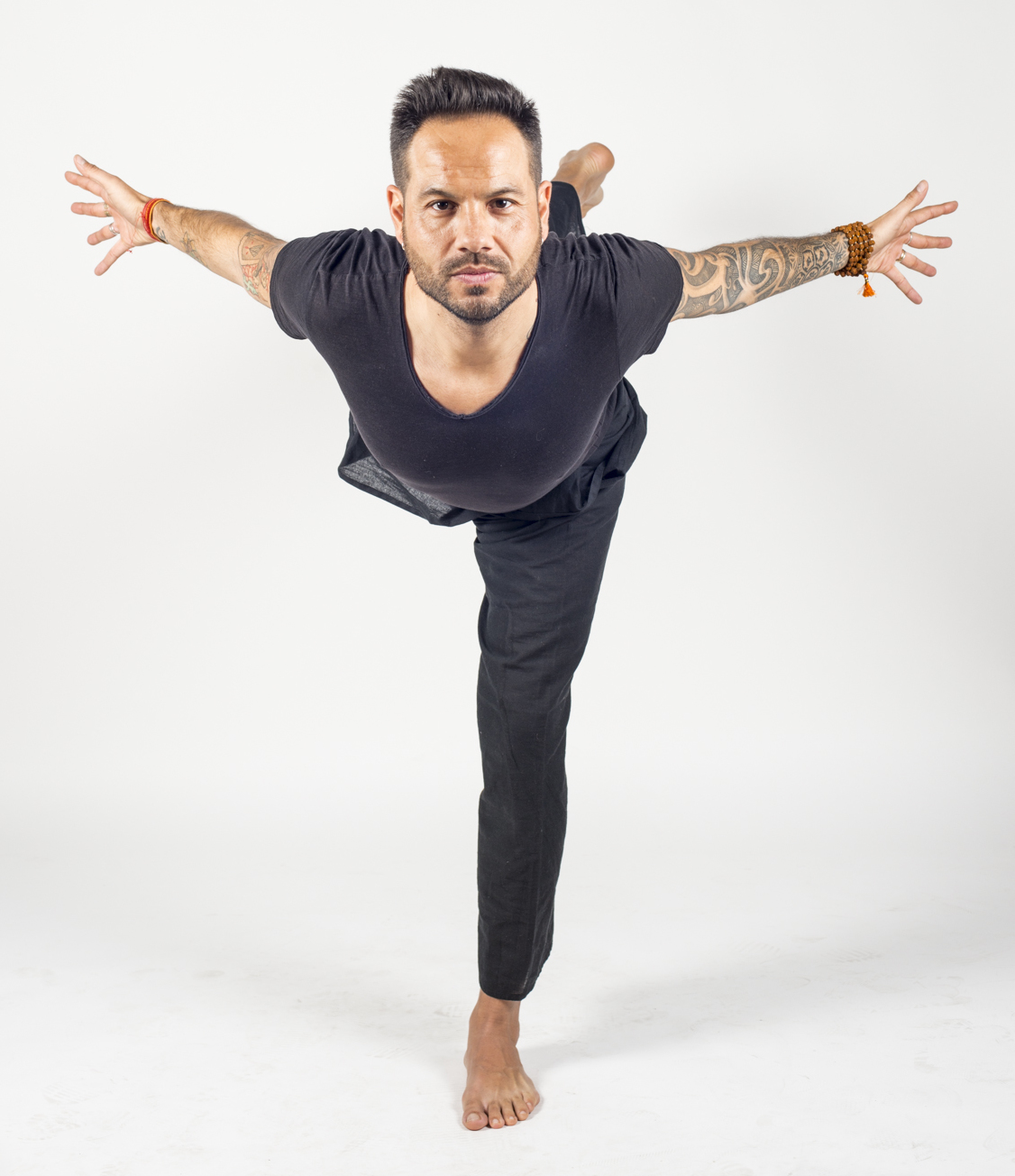
Virabhadrasana III variant with arms out to sides and back arched

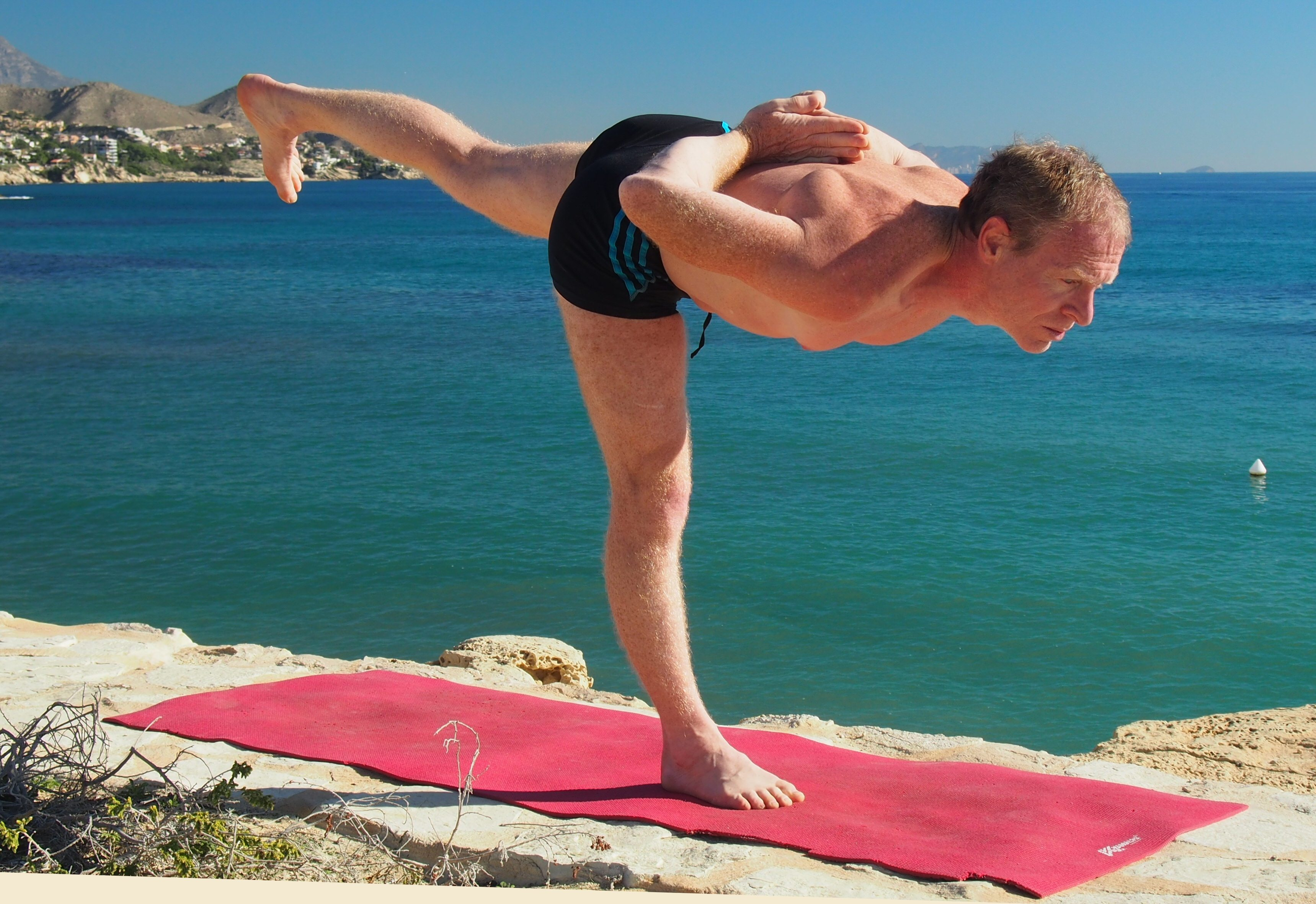
Virabhadrasana III variant with hands in reverse prayer position on the lower back

== See also ==
- List of asanas

== Sources ==
- Iyengar, B. K. S. (1979) [1966]. Light on Yoga: Yoga Dipika. Unwin Paperbacks.
- Lidell, Lucy, The Sivananda Yoga Centre (1983). The Book of Yoga. Ebury Publishing. ISBN 978-0-85223-297-2. OCLC 12457963.
- Mehta, Silva; Mehta, Mira; Mehta, Shyam (1990). Yoga: The Iyengar Way. Dorling-Kindersley.
