= Prasarita Padottanasana =

Standing forward bending yoga position

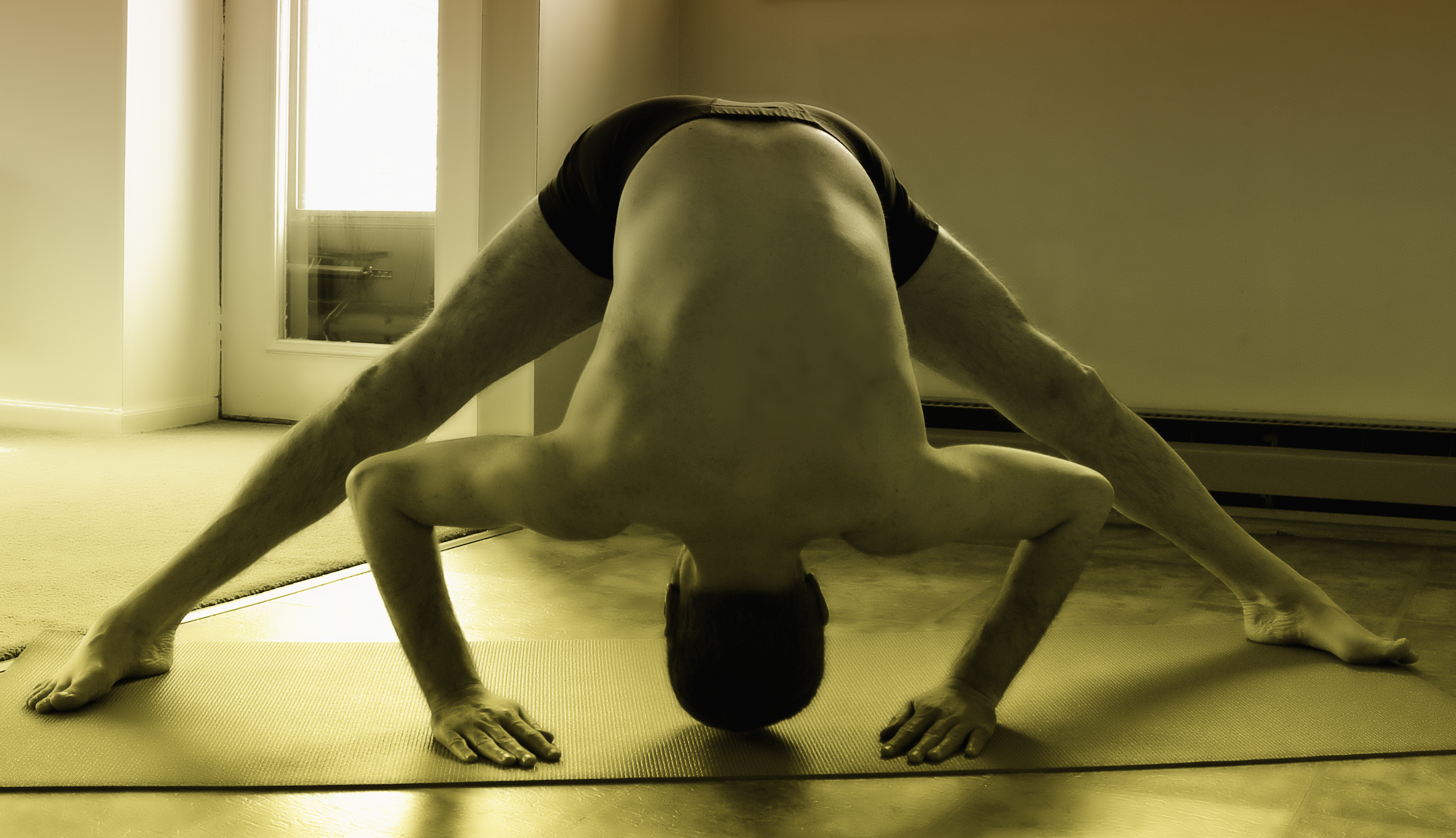
Prasarita Padottanasana

Prasarita Padottanasana (Sanskrit: प्रसारित पादोत्तानासन, IAST: Prasārita Pādottānāsana) or Wide Stance Forward Bend is a standing forward bend asana in modern yoga as exercise.

== Etymology and origins ==
The name comes from the Sanskrit Prasārita (प्रसारित) meaning "spread out", Pada (पाद) meaning "foot", Uttan (उत्तान) meaning "extended", and Asana (आसन) meaning "posture" or "seat".

The pose is not found in medieval hatha yoga texts. It is described in the 20th century by Krishnamacharya in Yoga Makaranda and Yogasanagalu, and also by his to pupils, Pattabhi Jois in his Ashtanga (vinyasa) yoga, and B. K. S. Iyengar in his Light on Yoga.

== Description ==
This is a standing pose with the feet wide apart and the body folded forward and down until in the completed pose the head touches the ground and the hands are placed flat on the ground, the tips of the fingers in line with the heels, the arms bent at right angles. In Ashtanga yoga, four variant forms of the asana, which is considered fundamental to that style of yoga, are identified. A pair of yoga blocks may be placed under the hands to allow those with tight hamstrings to execute the pose without strain.

== Variations ==
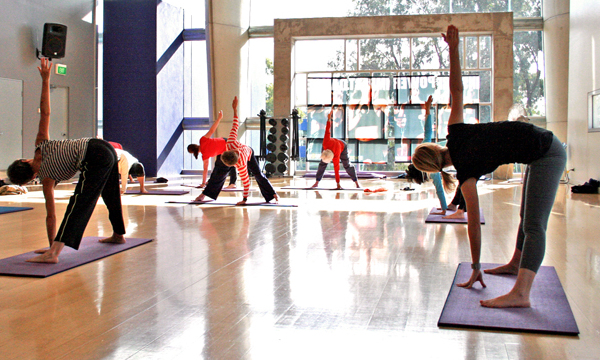
Parivritta Prasarita Padottanasana, the rotated variant of the pose

The rotated variant of the pose is Parivritta Prasarita Padottanasana. The position of the legs is unchanged, but the body is rotated so that one hand is on the floor, while the other arm, directly above that hand, is pointing straight upwards; the gaze is directed to the side or upwards. A yoga block may be placed under the lower hand to enable the pose to be held without strain.

The reclining form of the pose is Suptakoṇāsana.
