= Lotus position =

Cross-legged sitting meditation pose

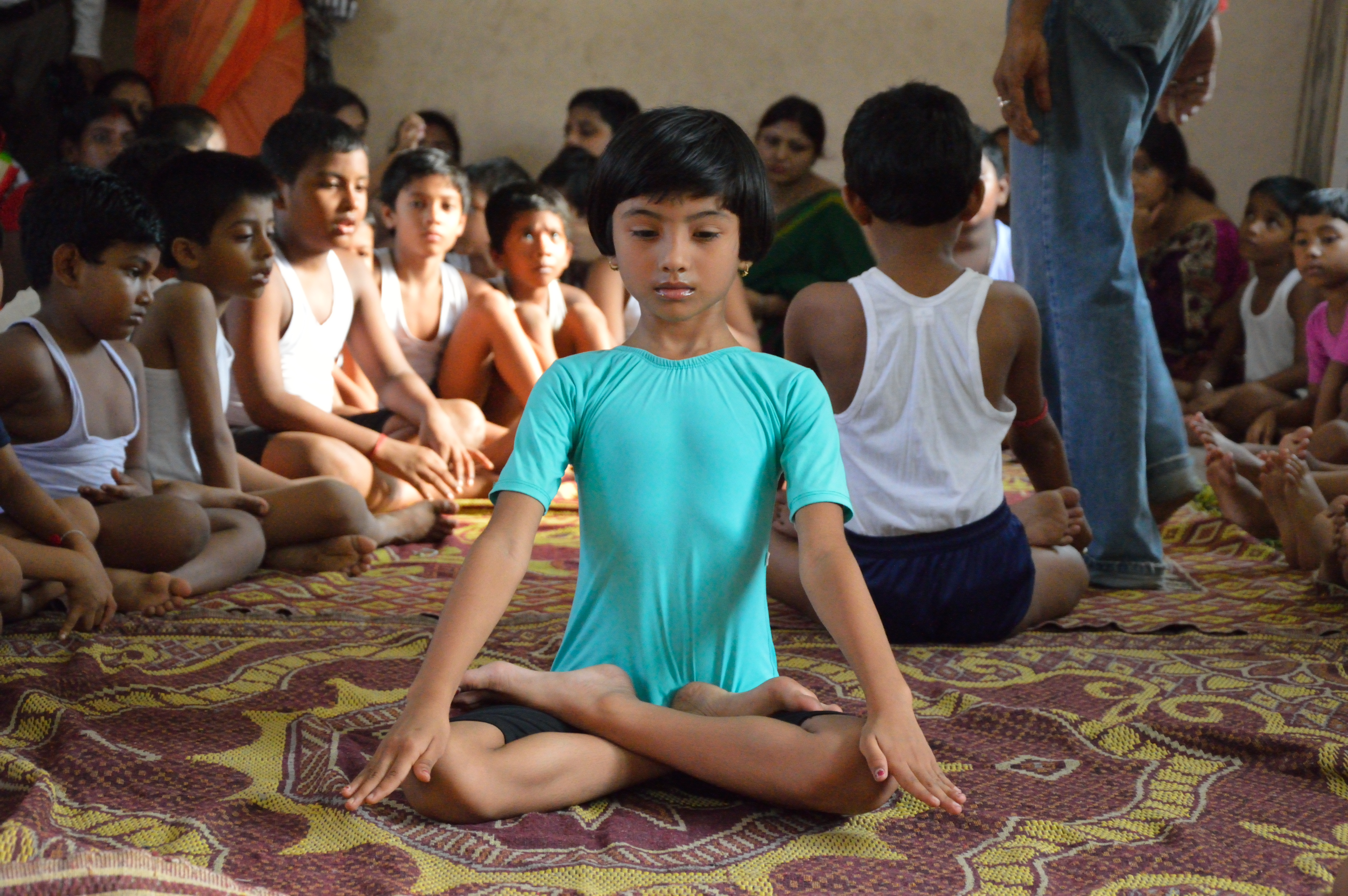
Demonstrating lotus position

Lotus position or Padmasana (Sanskrit: पद्मासन, romanized: padmāsana) is a cross-legged sitting meditation pose from ancient India, in which each foot is placed on the opposite thigh. It is an ancient asana in yoga, predating hatha yoga, and is widely used for meditation in Hindu, Tantra, Jain, and Buddhist traditions.

Variations include easy pose (Sukhasana), half lotus, bound lotus, and psychic union pose. Advanced variations of several other asanas including yoga headstand have the legs in lotus or half lotus. The pose can be uncomfortable for people not used to sitting on the floor, and attempts to force the legs into position can injure the knees.

Shiva, the meditating ascetic God of Hinduism; Gautama Buddha, the founder of Buddhism; and the Tirthankaras in Jainism have been depicted in the lotus position, especially in statues. The pose is emblematic both of Buddhist meditation and of yoga, and as such has found a place in Western culture as a symbol of healthy living and well-being.

== Etymology and history ==
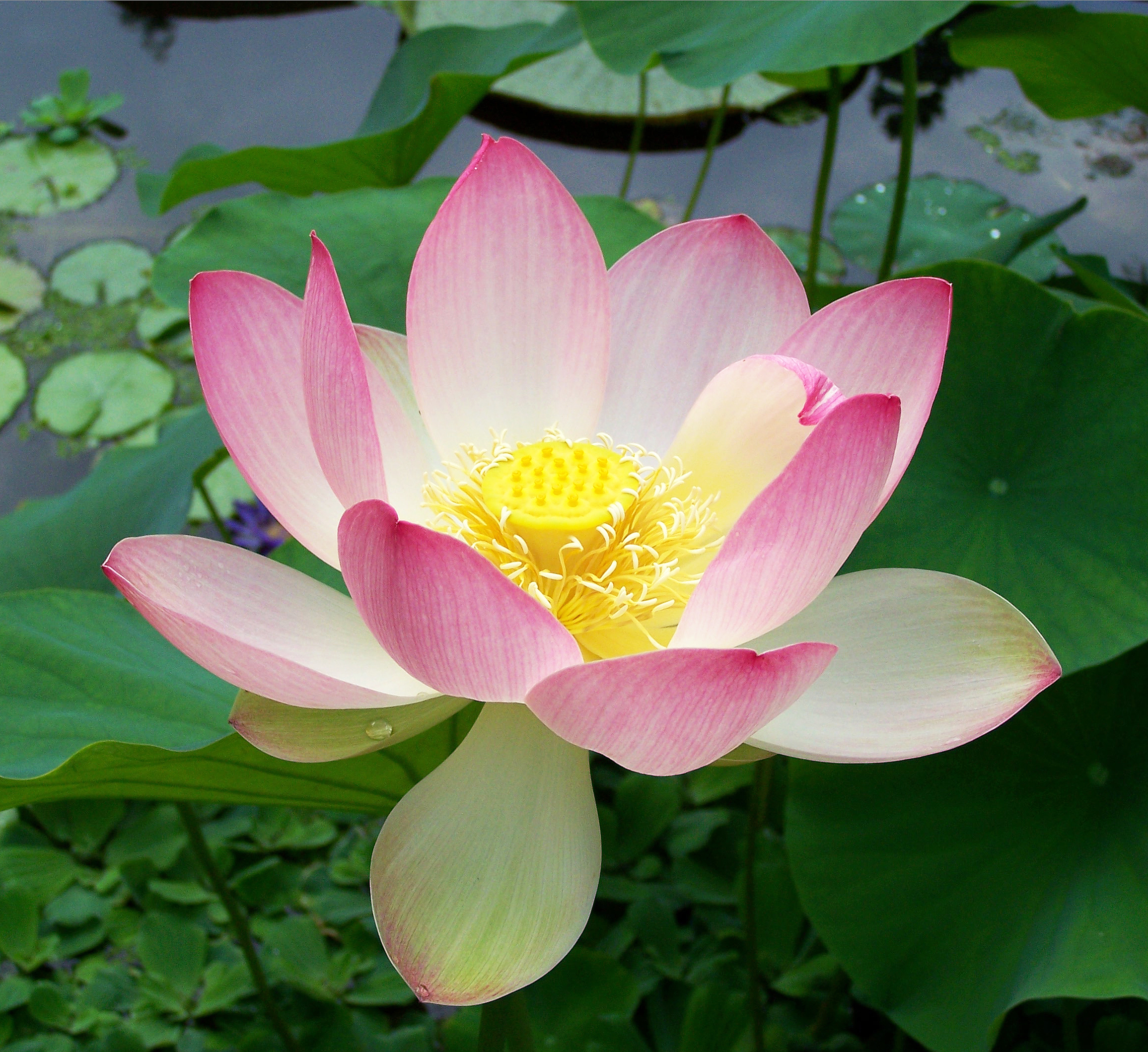
The flower of the sacred lotus, Nelumbo nucifera, grows out of mud, thus symbolising enlightenment.

The name Padmasana is from the Sanskrit पद्म Padma, "lotus" and आसन Āsana, "posture" or "seat". In Asian cultures, the sacred lotus is used as a symbol of growth towards perfection and enlightenment as it is rooted in the mud at the bottom of the pond, but rises and blooms above the water. In Chinese and Tibetan Buddhism, the pose is also called the "vajra position" (Skt. vajrāsana, Ch. 金剛座 jīngāngzuò).

The pose is ancient and is described, along with other asanas (postures), in the 8th century book Patanjalayogashastravivarana. A figure seated in lotus position on a lotus flower is shown on dinar coins of Chandragupta II, who reigned c. 380 – c. 415 CE. The first tantric text to discuss posture (asana), the 6th–10th century Nisvasattvasamhita Nayasutra (4.11-17, 4.104-106), directs the meditator and "user of mantras" to sit in lotus or a similar posture. The 15th century Hatha Yoga Pradipika states that the pose destroys all diseases, and that a yogin in the pose who retains the air breathed in through the nadi channels attains liberation.

Sukhasana is from Sanskrit सुख sukha, meaning "pleasure" or "ease". The 19th century Sritattvanidhi describes and illustrates the pose. The name, and the more general name Yogasana ("Yoga pose") which may denote a variety of sitting poses, is found in much older documents as a meditation seat, such as in the 4th century Darshana Upanishad.

== Position ==
From sitting with the legs crossed on the floor (Sukhasana), one foot is placed on top of the opposite thigh with its sole facing upward and heel close to the abdomen. The other foot is then placed on the opposite thigh as symmetrically as possible. The pose requires "very open hips". It can be modified using a support such as a cushion or blanket; by sitting on its forward edge, the pelvis is tilted forward.

== Variations ==
Sukhasana (Sanskrit: सुखासन, romanized: Sukhāsana), easy pose, has the legs crossed in front of the body.

In half lotus, अर्ध पद्मासन (Ardha Padmasana), one leg is bent and rests on the ground, the other leg is bent with the foot in lotus position. It is an easier meditation position than full lotus.

In bound lotus, बद्ध पद्मासन (Baddha Padmasana), the practitioner sits in full lotus, and each hand reaches around the back to grasp the opposite foot.

In psychic union pose, योगमुद्रासन (Yogamudrasana), the practitioner bends forward in full lotus, bringing the forehead as close to the floor as possible. The pose is both an asana and a mudra; easier variants begin from Ardha Padmasana.

Variations of several other asanas such as Sirsasana (yoga headstand), Sarvangasana (shoulderstand), Simhasana (lion pose), Matsyasana (fish pose), and Gorakshasana (cowherd pose) have the legs in lotus. Asanas such as Vatayanasana (horse pose) and advanced forms of Ardha Matsyendrasana (half lord of the fishes pose) have one leg as in half lotus.

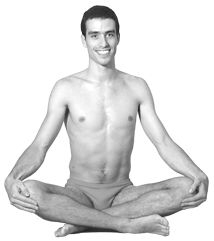
Sukhasana, easy pose

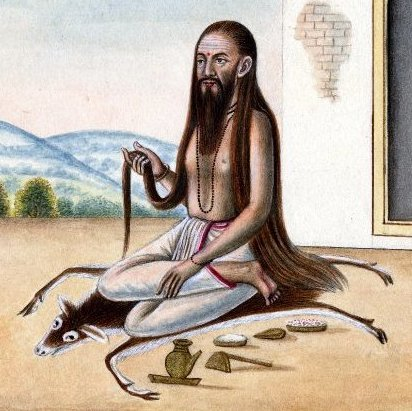
The sage Bharadvaja meditating in half lotus. 19th century

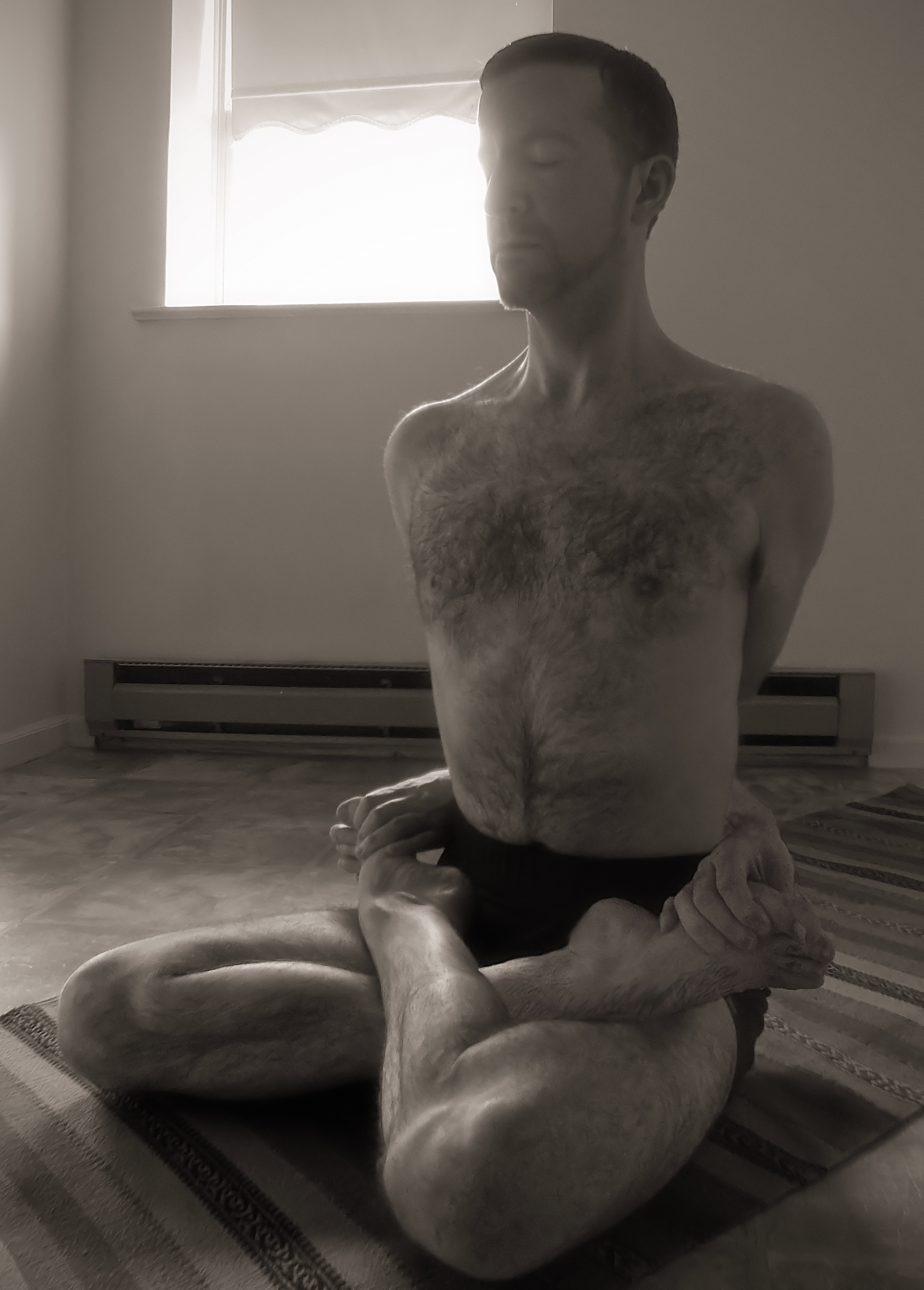
Baddha Padmasana

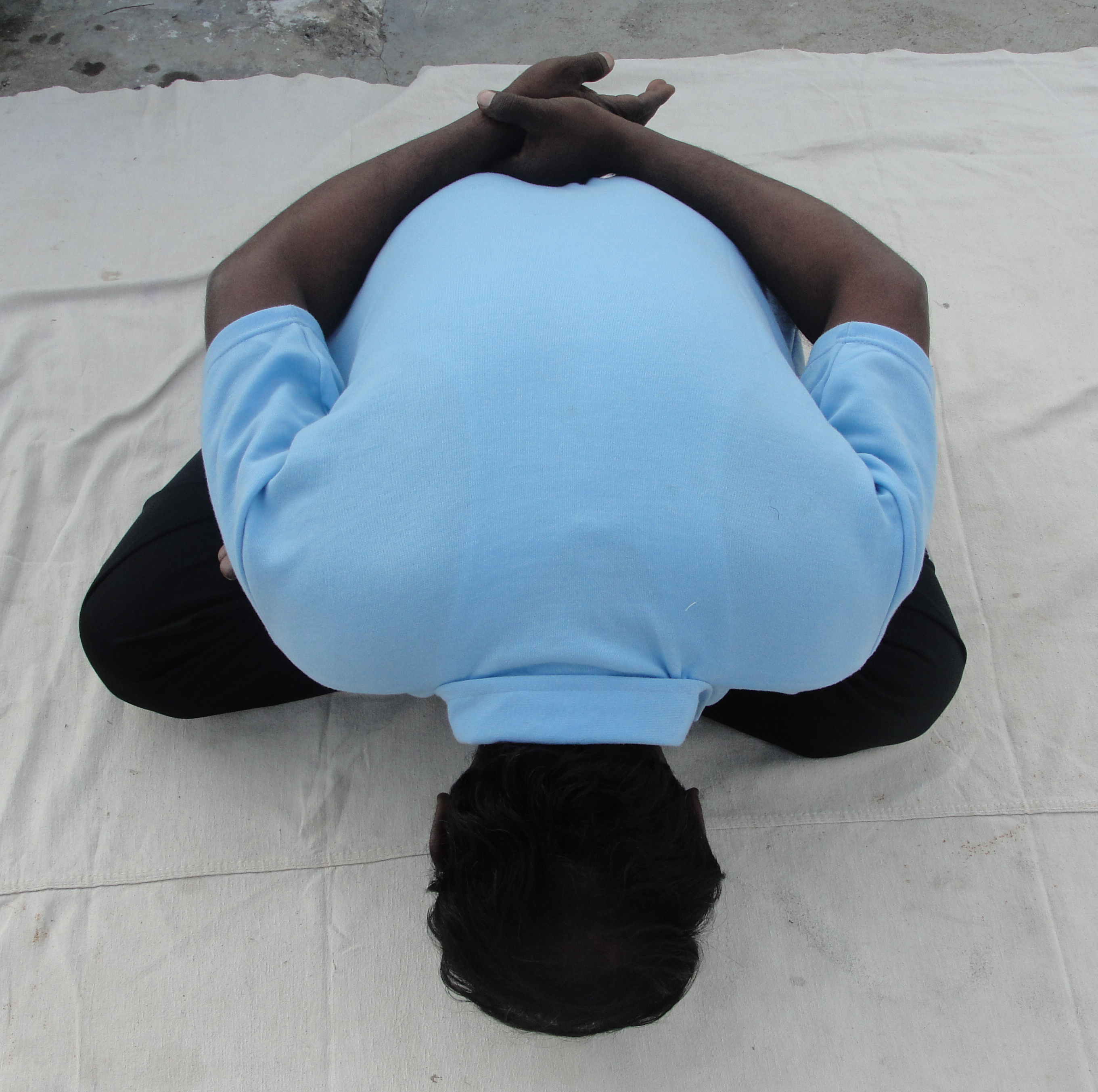
Yogamudrasana

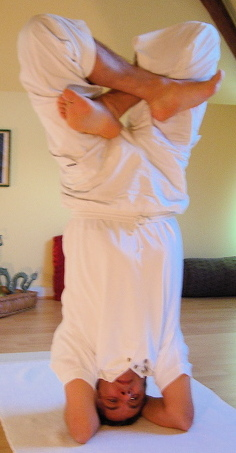
Padma Sirsasana, lotus headstand

== Effects ==
The Lotus position is one of the yoga poses that most commonly causes injury. Attempts to force the legs into lotus pose can injure the knees by squeezing and damaging the medial meniscus cartilage; this is painful and takes a long time to heal. The hip joints must rotate outwards approximately 115 degrees to permit full lotus. Students who cannot achieve this much hip rotation may try to compensate by bending the knee joint sideways, risking injury. Rather than bending the knee, the thighs can be encouraged to rotate outwards (using hand pressure or a strap).

The yoga guru B. K. S. Iyengar notes that people unused to sitting on the floor will initially feel "excruciating" pain in the knees, but that this subsides with practice, until the pose becomes relaxing, both restful and alert and hence ideal for pranayama.

Twentieth century advocates of some schools of yoga, such as Iyengar, made claims for the effects of yoga on specific organs, without adducing any evidence. Iyengar claimed that Padmasana encourages blood circulation in the abdomen and lumbar region, toning the spine and abdominal organs.

== In art and culture ==
=== Asian art ===
In Buddhism, statues of the founder, Gautama Buddha, sometimes depict him seated in lotus position and enthroned on a lotus flower. In Hinduism, statues often depict gods, especially Shiva, meditating in Padmasana. In Bali, a Padmasana is also a type of Hindu shrine, named for the posture. In Jainism, seated Tirthankaras are represented in Lotus posture.

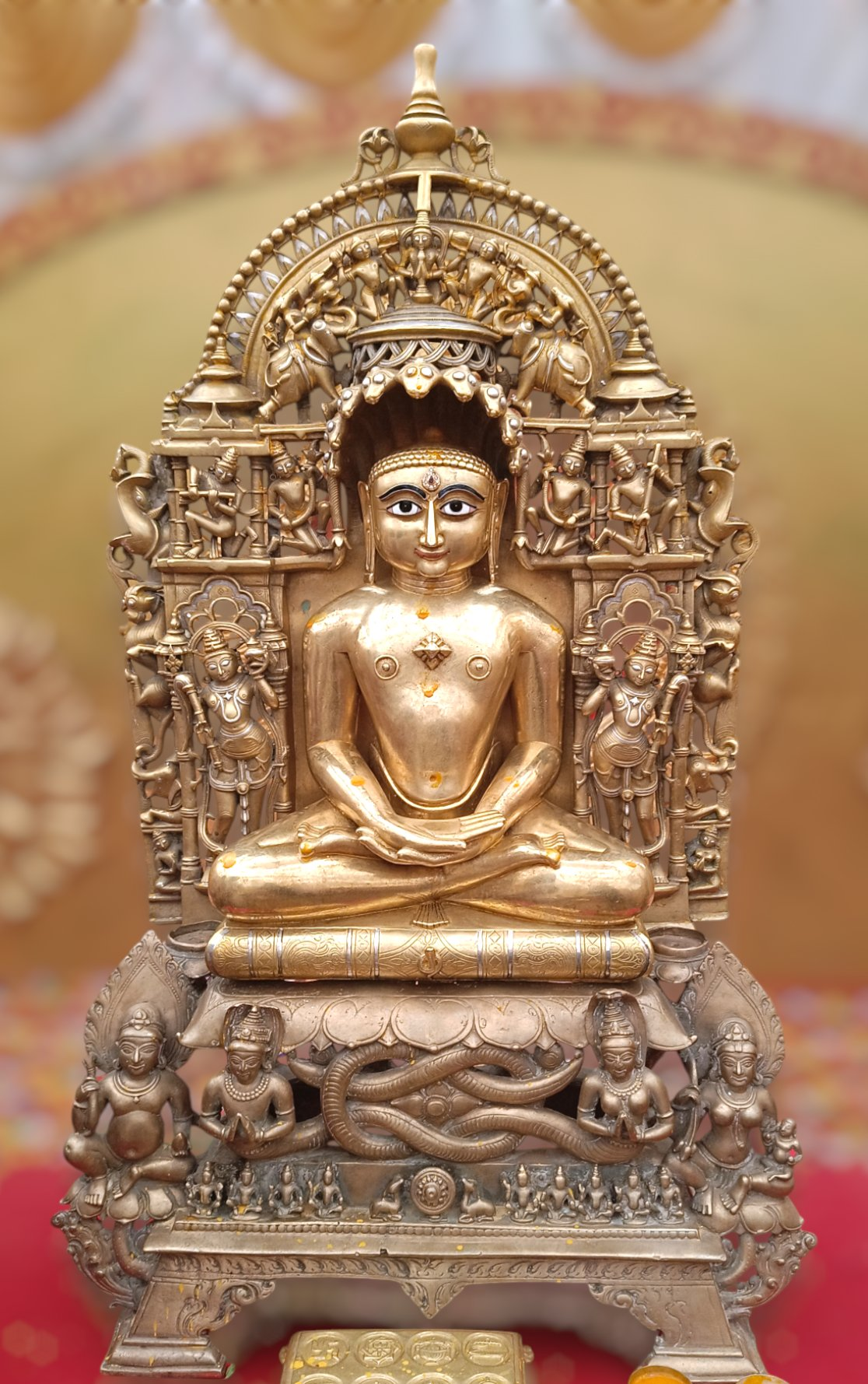
A 10th century CE idol of Parshvanatha in Lotus position from Patan, Gujarat

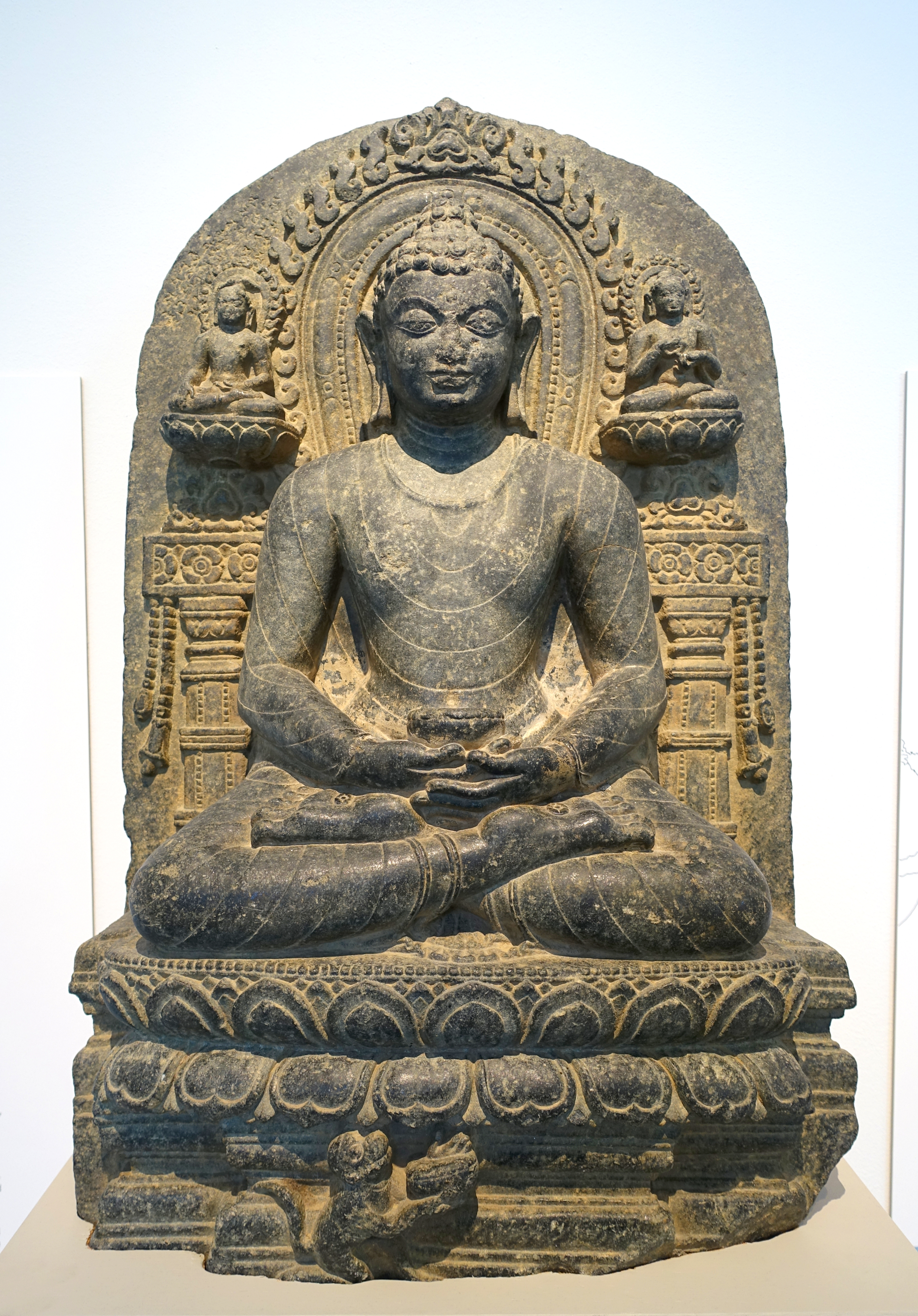
Gautama Buddha

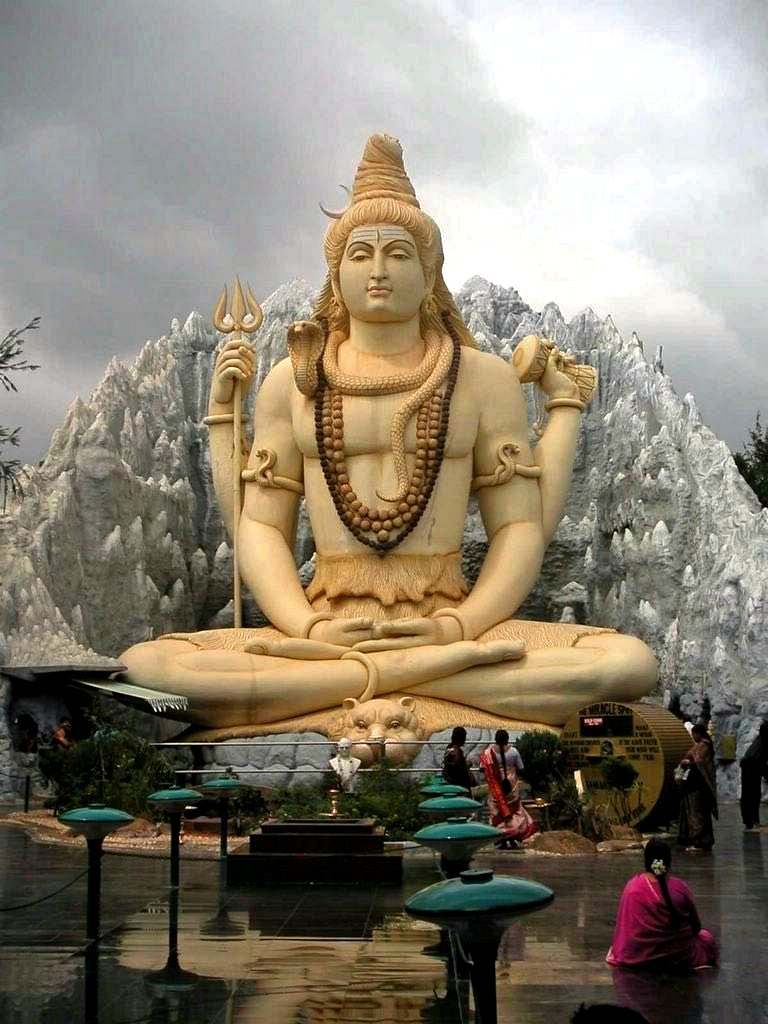
Shiva

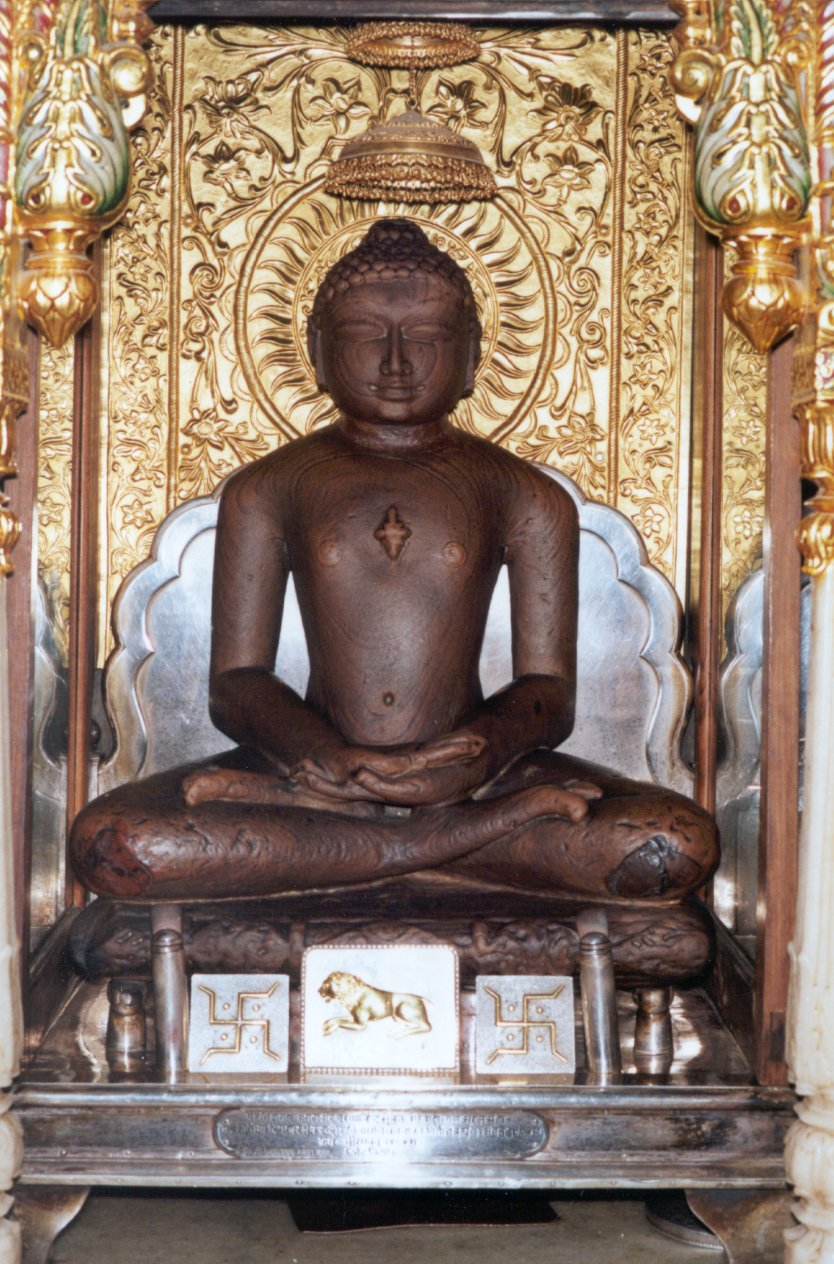
Mahavira

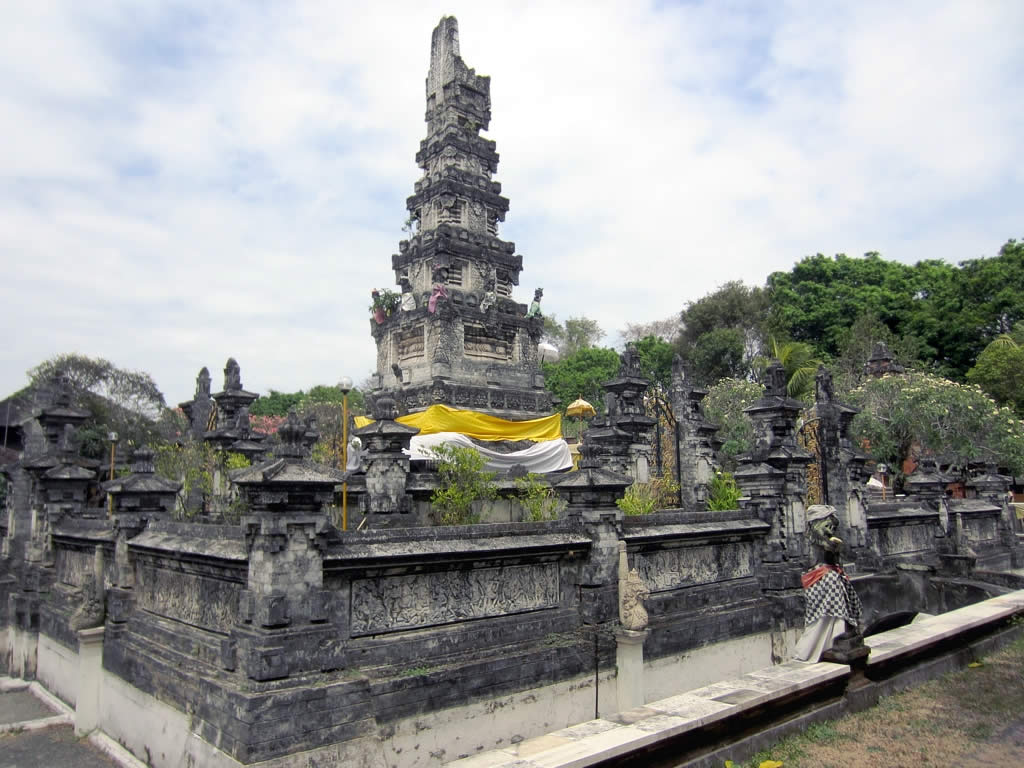
A Padmasana shrine, here of Pura Jagatnatha in Denpasar, Bali

=== Western culture ===
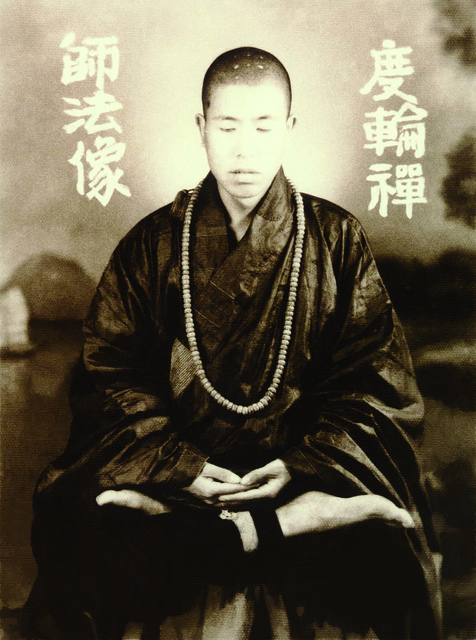
Buddhist monk Hsuan Hua meditating, c. 1953

The scholar of religion Thomas Tweed wrote in 2008 that "the prevailing image of Buddhist practice has been the solitary meditator, eyes half closed, sitting in the lotus position." Ian Fleming's 1964 novel You Only Live Twice has the action hero James Bond visiting Japan, where he "assiduously practised sitting in the lotus position." The critic Lisa M. Dresner notes that Bond is mirroring Fleming's own struggles with the pose. The BBC journalist Megan Lane commented in 2003 that since yoga as exercise had become mainstream, lotus position (like tree pose) had been used by advertisers to sell "all manner of goods and services." She noted that both "healthy living" goods such as vitamins, fitness clubs, water filter and probiotic yogurt, and unrelated items such as cars, airlines, financial services "and even beer" have made use of images of yoga to convey a message of well-being. Poland's Obory Dairy gave its advertising agency the goal of creating awareness of their "Jogi" yogurt as exclusive and with a positive image. The agency responded with a photograph of two young women meditating in lotus pose at dawn under the heading "Start your day with Jogi", the brand name also meaning "yoga" in Polish.

== See also ==
- Kukkutasana, cockerel pose, a balancing asana with the hands threaded through the folded legs of Padmasana
- List of asanas
- Maravijaya
- Padmasana (shrine)
- Zazen

== Sources ==
- Iyengar, B. K. S. (1991) [1966]. Light on Yoga. Unwin Paperbacks. ISBN 978-1-85538-166-7.
- Jain, Andrea (2015). Selling Yoga: from Counterculture to Pop culture. Oxford University Press. ISBN 978-0-19-939024-3. OCLC 878953765.
- Mallinson, James; Singleton, Mark (2017). Roots of Yoga. Penguin Books. ISBN 978-0-241-25304-5. OCLC 928480104.
- Newcombe, Suzanne (2019). Yoga in Britain: Stretching Spirituality and Educating Yogis. Bristol, England: Equinox Publishing. ISBN 978-1-78179-661-0.
- Saraswati, Satyananda (January 2004). A Systematic Course in the Ancient Tantric Techniques of Yoga and Kriya. Nesma Books India. ISBN 978-81-85787-08-4.
- Temple, Anton (2007). Becoming the lotus: a systematic course of stretching and posture leading to the safe and comfortable adoption of the lotus posture, including a guide to the symbolism and spiritual meaning behind the lotus flower. Merkur. ISBN 978-1-885928-18-4.
