= Tree pose =

Standing balancing posture in hatha yoga

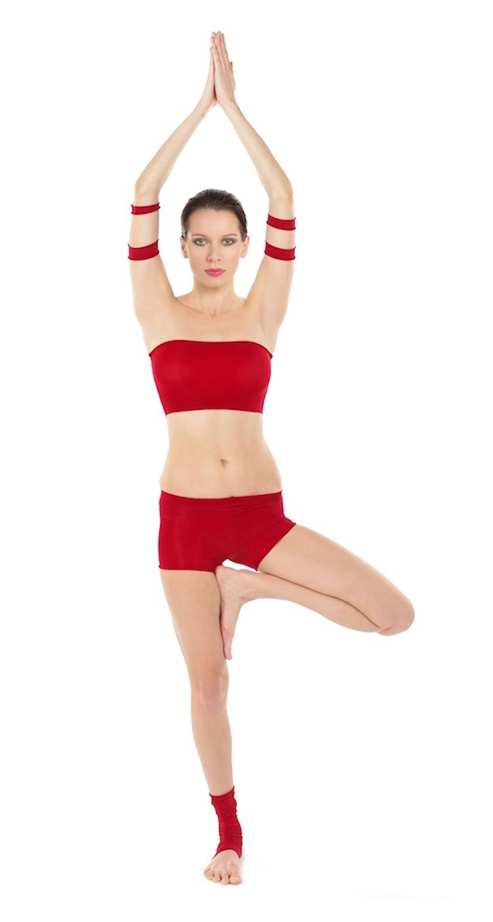
Vrikshasana or Tree pose

Tree pose or Vrikshasana (Sanskrit: वृक्षासन, romanized: vṛkṣāsana) is a balancing asana. It is one of the very few standing poses in medieval hatha yoga, and remains popular in modern yoga as exercise. The pose has been called iconic of modern yoga; it is often featured in yoga magazines, and practised in public displays such as for the International Day of Yoga.

== Etymology and origins ==
The name comes from the Sanskrit words vṛkṣa (वृक्ष) meaning 'tree', and āsana (आसन) meaning 'posture'.

A 7th-century stone carving in Mahabalipuram contains a figure standing on one leg; the yoga teacher Tias Little suggests that a pose similar to vrikshasana was in use at that time. Sadhus sometimes disciplined themselves by choosing to meditate in the pose.

The pose is described in the 17th century Gheraṇḍa Saṃhitā 2.36. More recently it has been called iconic of modern yoga; it is often featured in yoga magazines, and practised in public displays such as for the International Day of Yoga.

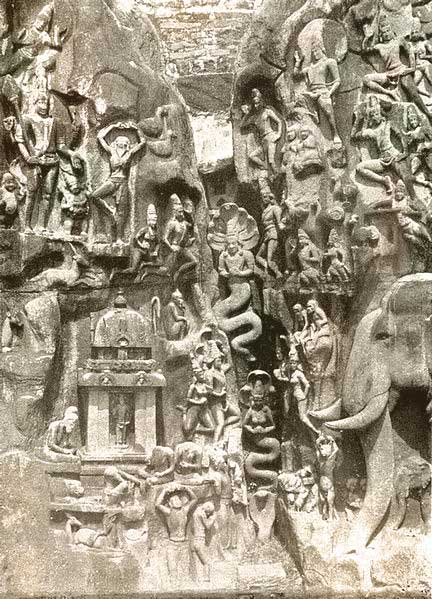
Rock relief at Mahabalipuram seems to show Vrikshasana at top left.

== Description ==
The pose is entered from Tadasana. The most common form has one knee bent and the foot of that leg placed on the inner thigh of the standing leg; alternatively, the bent leg may be placed in half lotus position. The hands are held above the head, either pointed directly upwards and unclasped, or clasped together in anjali mudra.

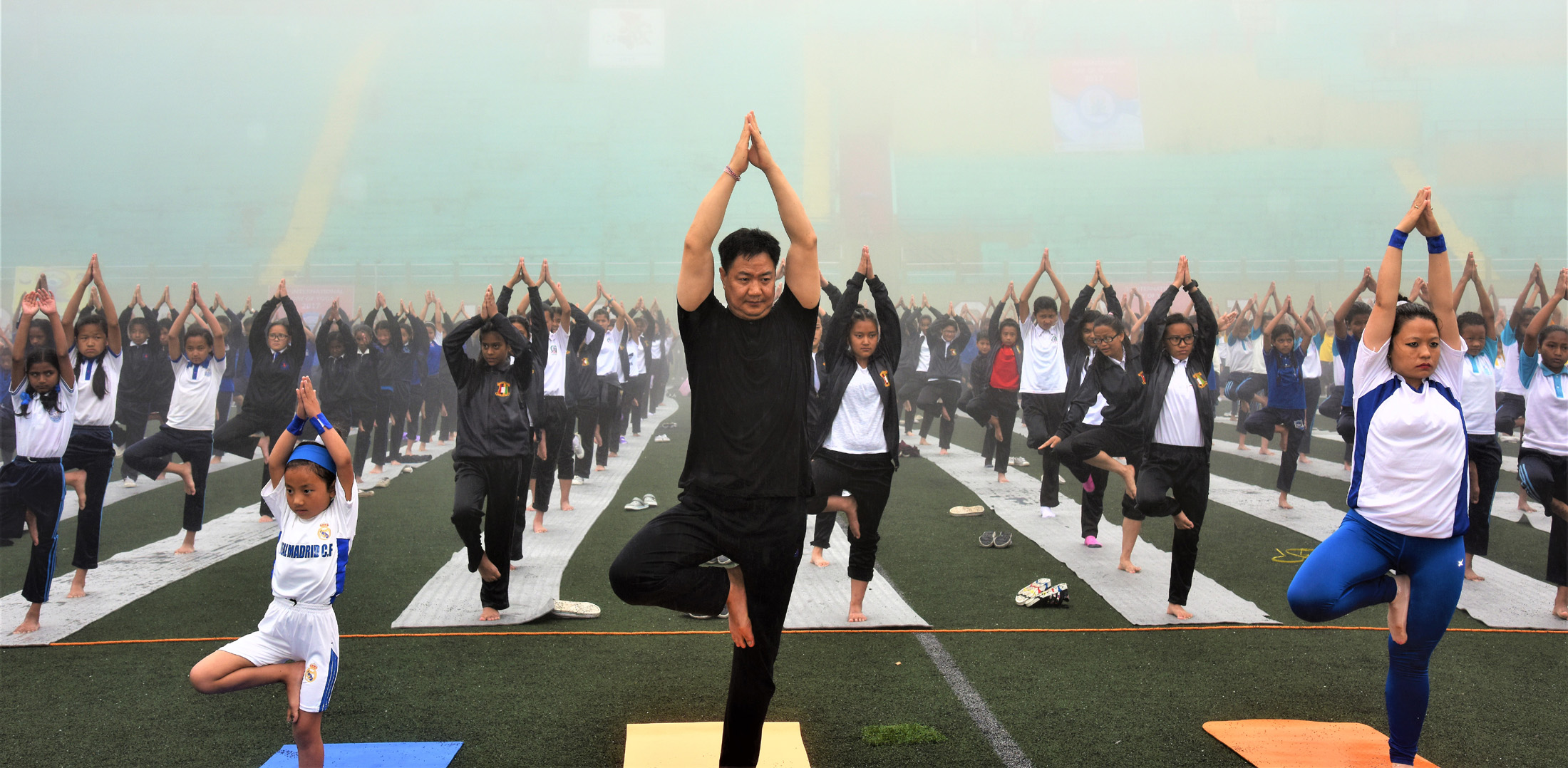
The Indian Minister of State for Home Affairs, Kiren Rijiju, in a public yoga session on the 3rd International Day of Yoga in Gangtok, Sikkim, 21 June 2017

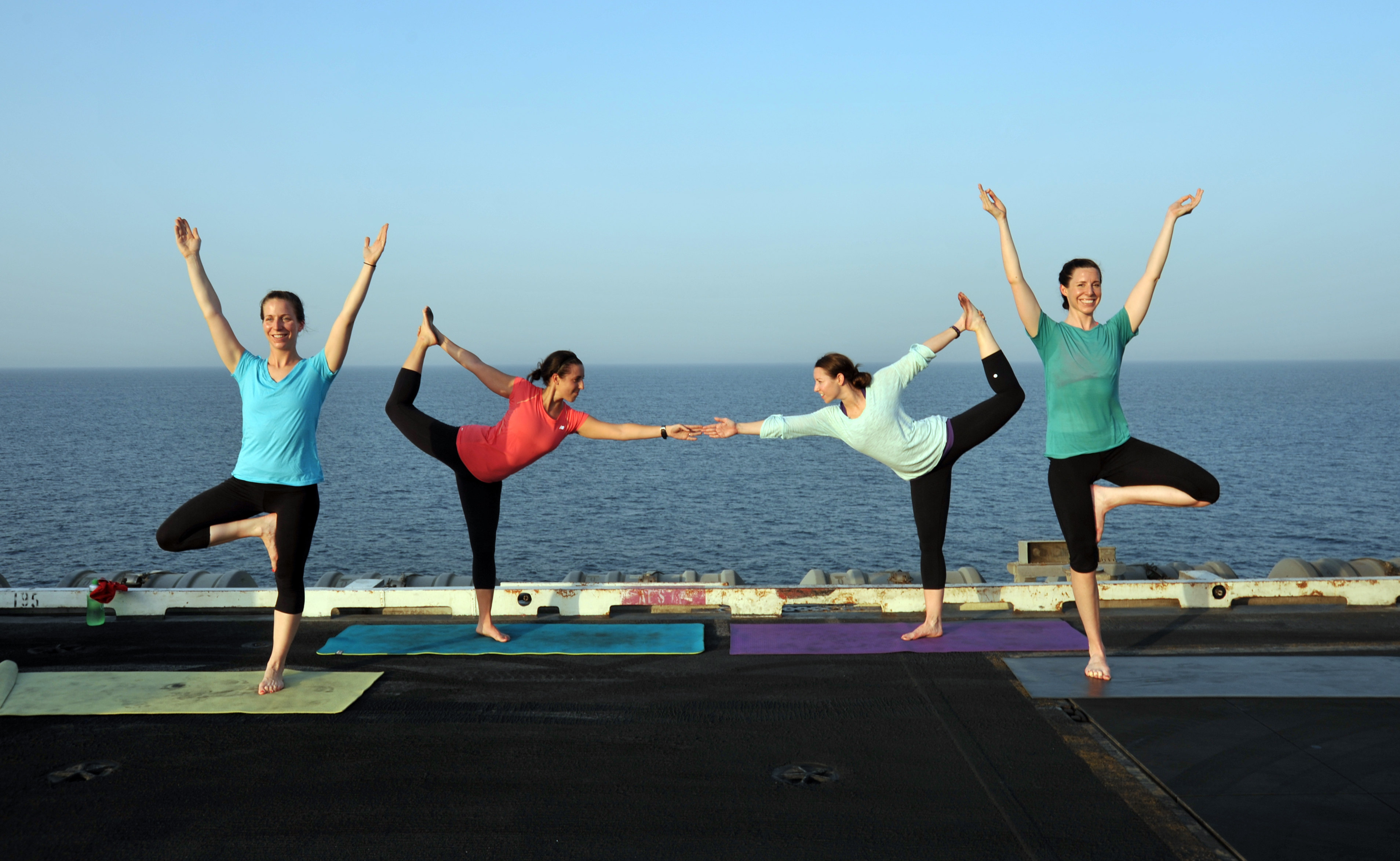
A US Navy yoga display on the flight deck of USS George H.W. Bush, using Vrikshasana and Natarajasana, 2014

== Variations ==
In Bikram Yoga, Tree pose (which it calls "Tadasana") has one leg folded in half lotus and the hands together over the chest in prayer position. It is followed by bending the straight leg into a squatting position (called Toe Stand or "Padangushtasana" in Bikram Yoga) with the heel raised and the thigh resting on the calf and heel, the other leg remaining in half lotus.

The pose may be modified according to the practitioner's ability to balance. The hands may be held apart, either straight up or out at an angle, or lowered into prayer position in front of the chest. Or, one heel can be raised and placed against the shin of the standing leg, if necessary keeping the toes on the ground. Another option is to stand beside a wall and place one hand on it. Alternatively, the pose can be practised reclining on the floor, if need be with a block under the bent knee.

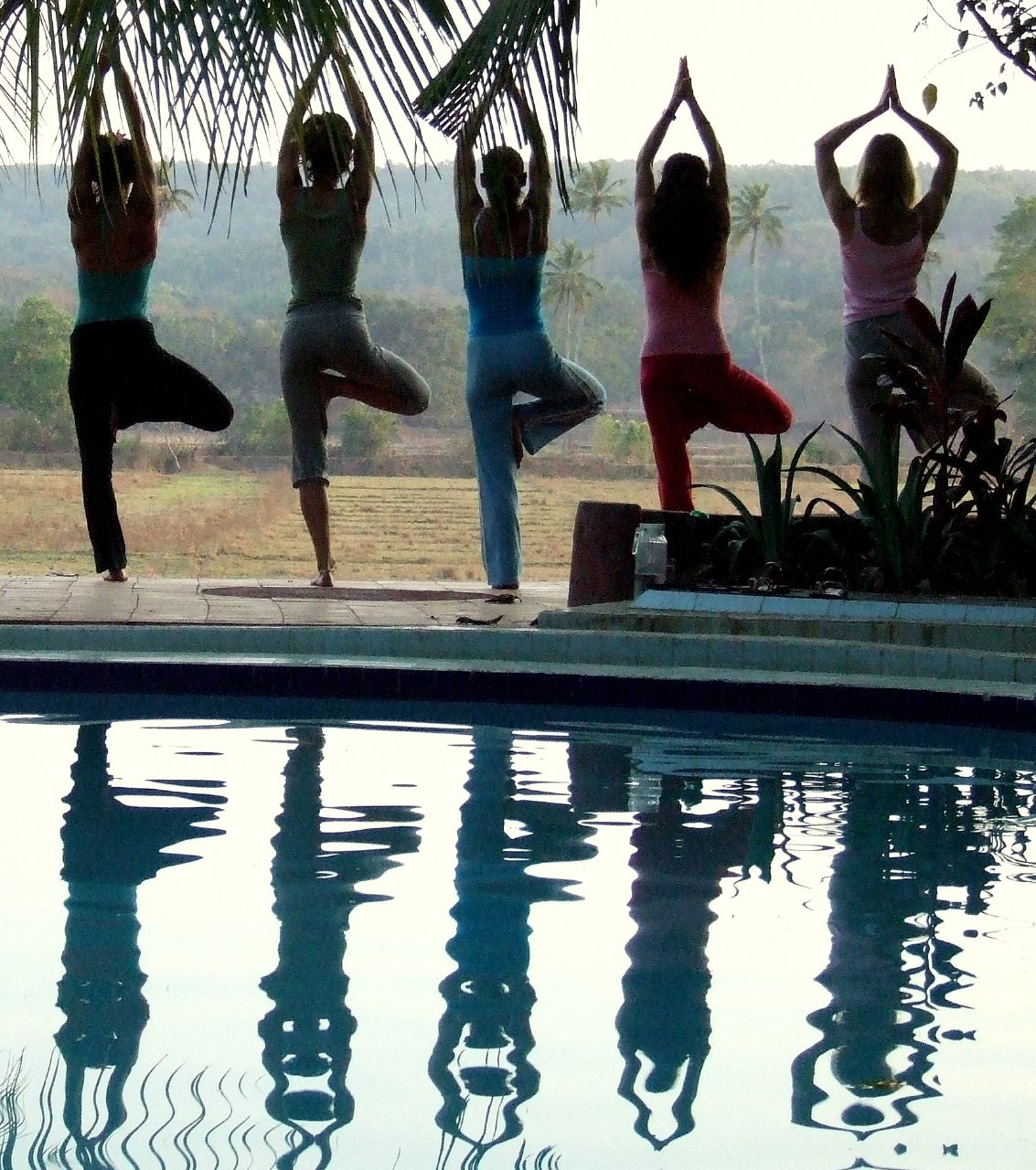
A group practising outdoors

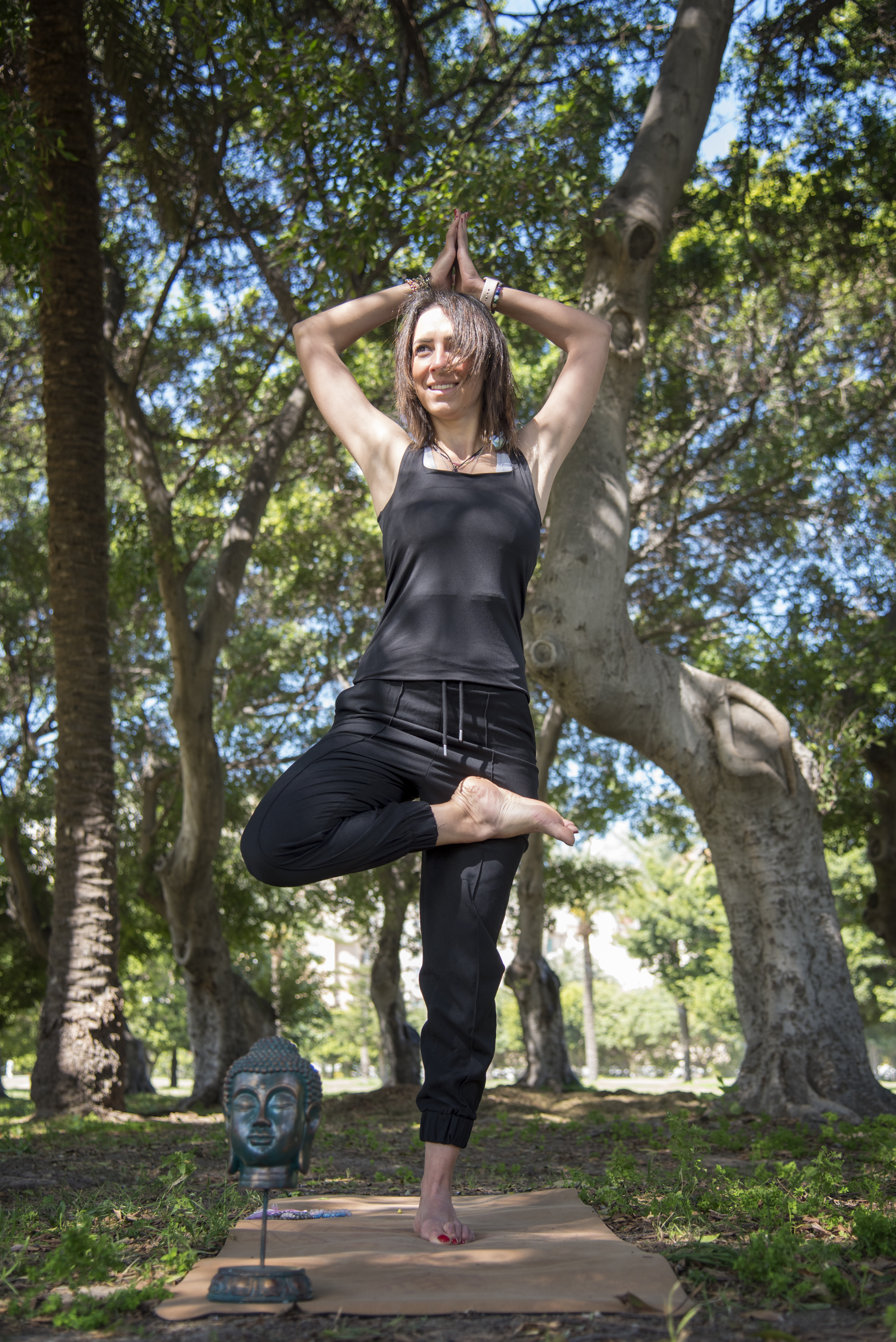
Variant with one leg in half lotus

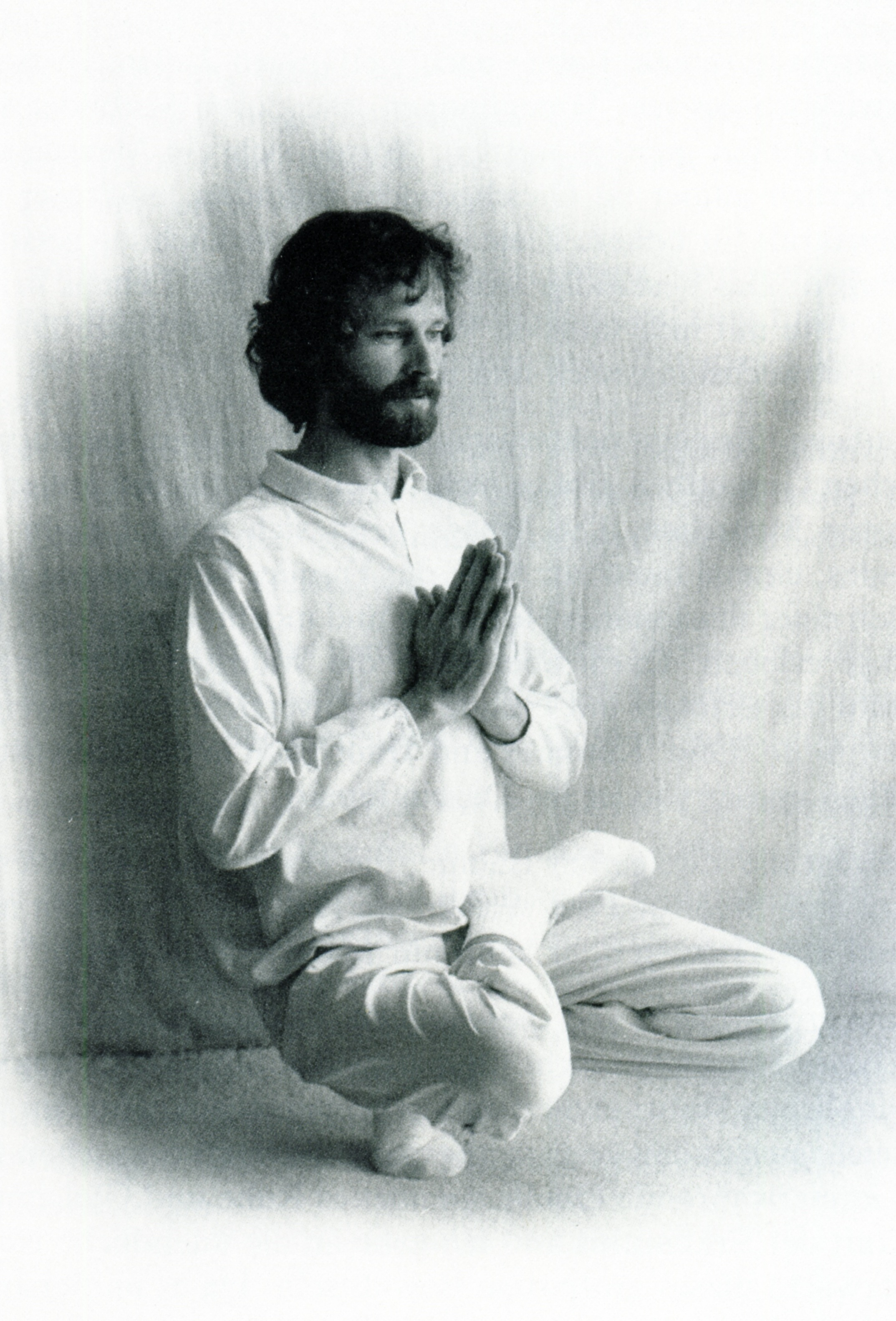
Heinz Grill in Padangushtasana,
Toe Stand

== Applications ==
Tree pose has been recommended for older people to help them maintain good balance and so to reduce the risk of injury from falls. There is preliminary evidence that a yoga programme including tree pose may help to prevent falls among older people.

== See also ==
- List of asanas
- Urdhva Vrikshasana, a variation of Tadasana

== Sources ==
- Iyengar, B.K.S. (1979). Light on Yoga (Revised ed.). Schocken Books. ISBN 978-0-8052-1031-6.
- Mehta, Silva; Mehta, Mira; Mehta, Shyam (1990). Yoga: The Iyengar Way. Dorling-Kindersley.
