= Garudasana =

Standing balancing posture in modern yoga

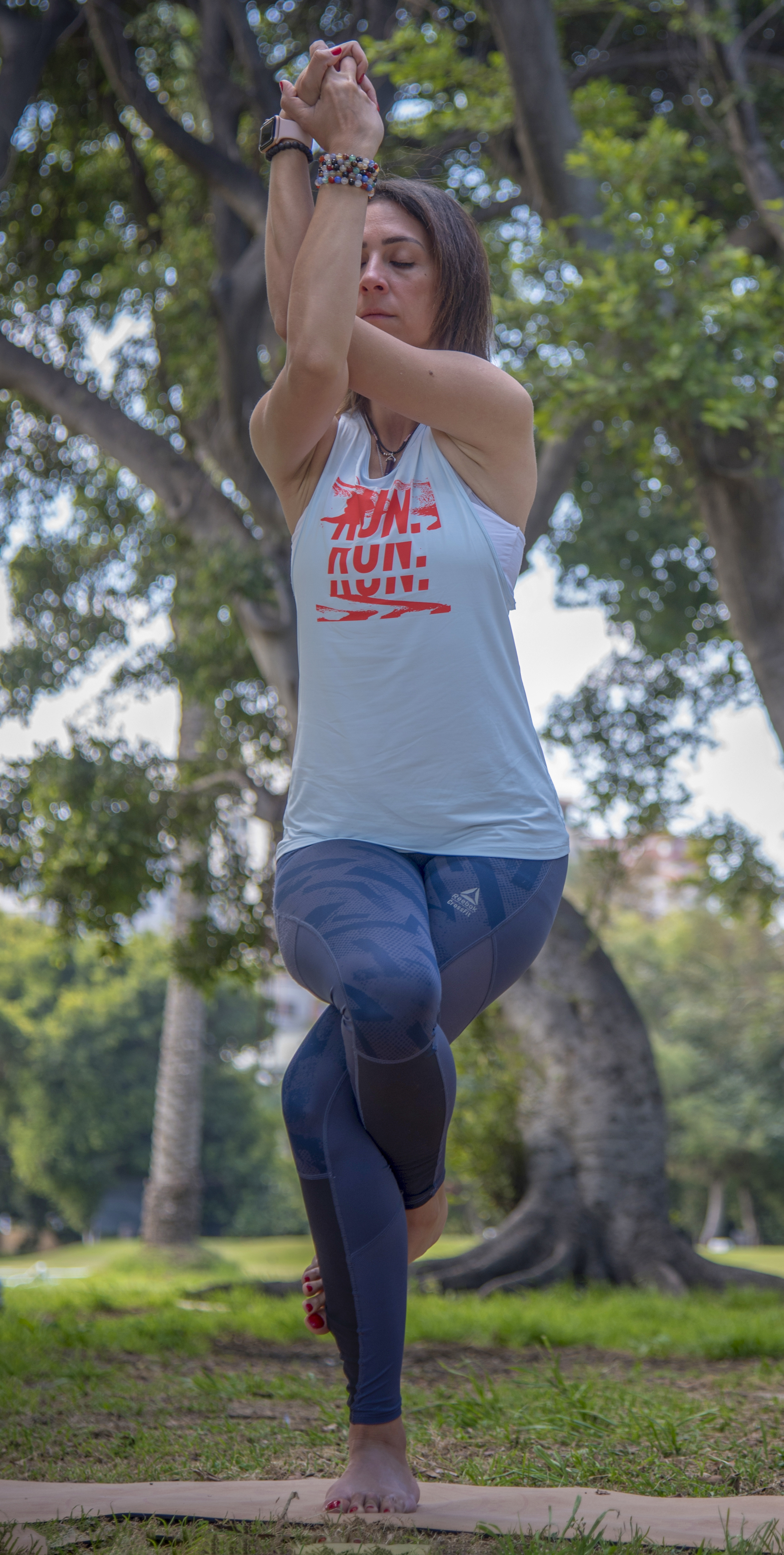
Garudasana, variant hand position

Garudasana (Sanskrit: गरुडासन; IAST: Garuḍāsana) or Eagle Pose is a standing balancing asana in modern yoga as exercise. The name was used in medieval hatha yoga for a different pose.

== Etymology and origins ==
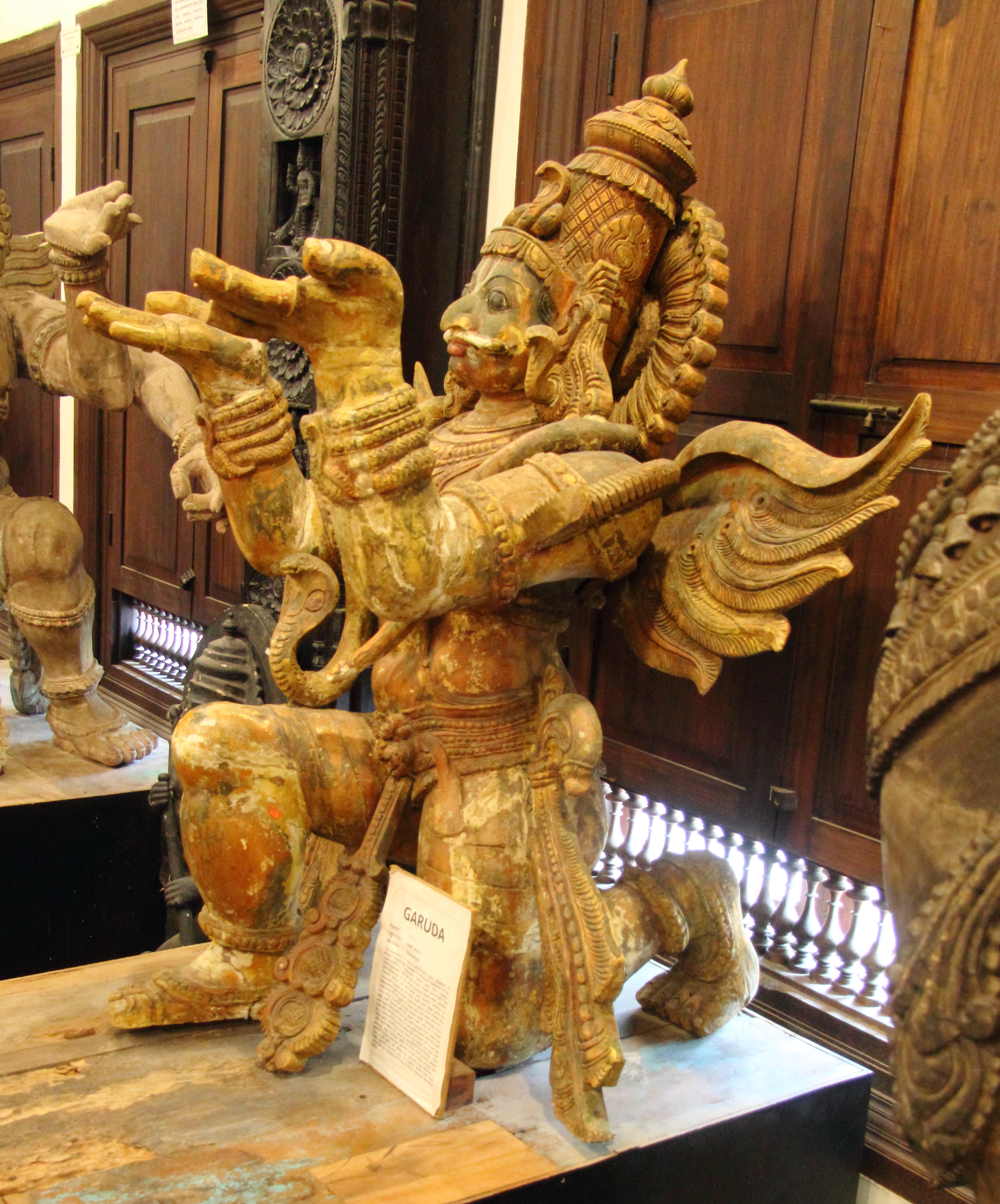
Garuda

The name comes from the Sanskrit words garuda (गरुड) meaning "eagle", and asana (आसन) meaning "posture" or "seat".

In Hindu mythology, Garuda is known as the king of birds. He is the vahana (mount) of the God Vishnu and is eager to help humanity fight against demons. The word is usually rendered into English as "eagle", though the name literally means "devourer", because Garuda was originally identified with the "all-consuming fire of the sun's rays".

The name is used for a different pose in the late 17th-century Gheranda Samhita, verse 2.37, which has the legs and thighs on the ground, and the hands on the knees.

A one-legged balancing pose named Garudasana but closer to Vrikshasana is described and illustrated in the 19th century Sritattvanidhi. The modern pose is described in Light on Yoga.

== Description ==
Garudasana is an asymmetric position in which one leg, say the right, is crossed over the left, while the arm on the opposite side, say the left, is crossed over the right, and the palms are pressed together. Like all poses on one leg, it demands, and may help to build, balance and concentration. According to Satyananda Saraswati, the two palms pressed together resemble the eagle's beak. The gaze is directed at a fixed point in front.

== Variations ==
A kneeling variant of the pose is Vātāyanāsana, Horse Pose.

== In literature ==
The actress Mariel Hemingway's 2002 autobiography Finding My Balance: A Memoir with Yoga describes how she used yoga to recover balance in her life after a dysfunctional upbringing. Each chapter is titled after an asana, the last being "Eagle Pose, or Garudasana", in each case with some life lesson related to the pose. She describes it as "a balancing posture with the arms and legs intricately intertwined [that] requires some flexibility, a lot of trust, and most of all, balance". The chapter recounts how she, her husband and her daughters all came close to drowning in canoes off Kauai, Hawaii. Doing the asana now "reminds me of the unconscious balance I achieved when I began successfully working my way through the surf without fighting. I spread my toes and pull up on the calf muscle."

== See also ==
- List of asanas

== Sources ==
- Iyengar, B. K. S. (1979) [1966]. Light on Yoga: Yoga Dipika. Thorsons. ISBN 978-1855381667.
- Saraswati, Swami Satyananda (2003). Asana Pranayama Mudra Bandha. Nesma Books India. ISBN 978-81-86336-14-4.
