= Yoga mat =

Exercise mat, mainly for yoga as exercise

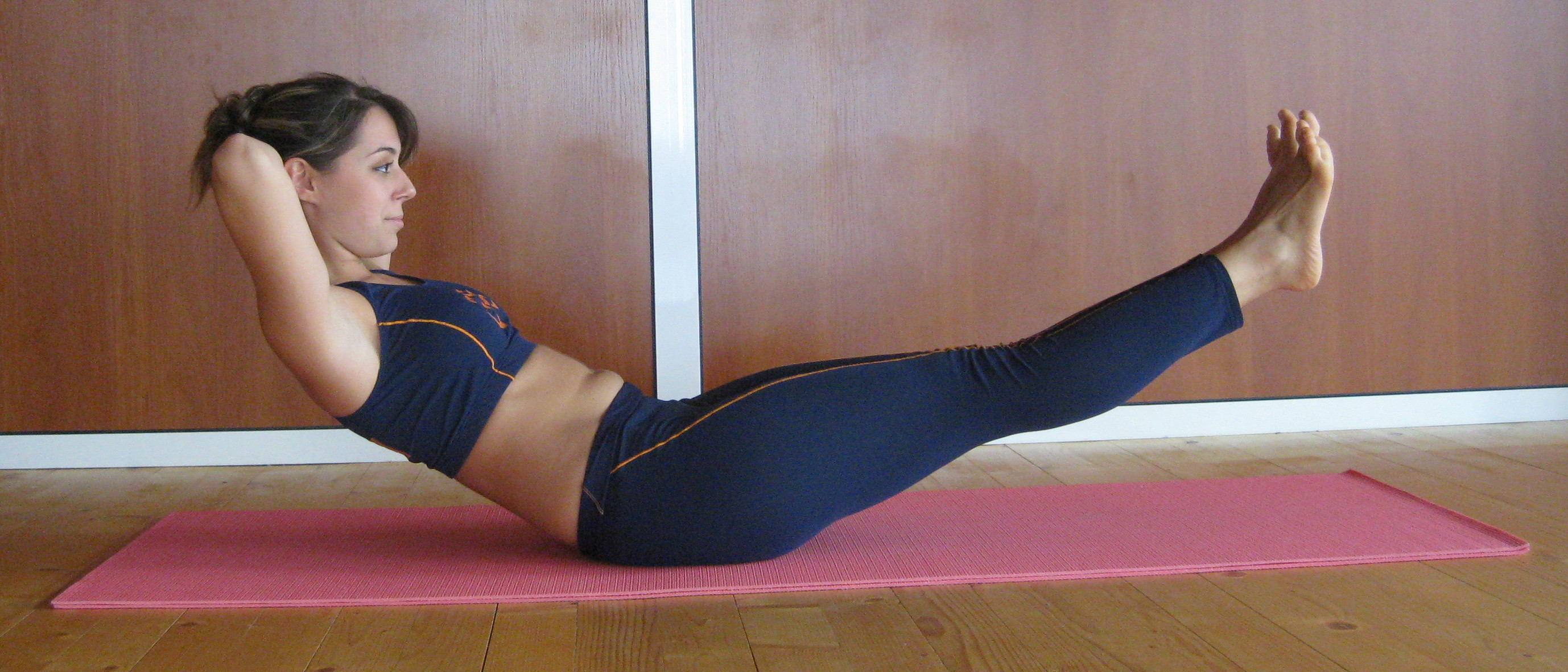
Ardha Navasana on a yoga mat

Yoga mats are specially fabricated mats used to prevent hands and feet slipping during asana practice in modern yoga as exercise. An early variety made of rubber carpet underlay, pioneered by the yoga teacher Angela Farmer in 1982, was called a sticky mat. Before modern times, meditative yoga and hatha yoga were practised on bare ground, sometimes with a deer or tiger skin rug. Modern mats suitable for energetic forms of yoga are made of plastic, rubber, and sometimes other materials including hessian and cork, trading off cost, comfort, grip, and weight. The yoga mat has been called "one of the most ubiquitous symbols of yoga's commercialization".

== History ==
=== In ancient India ===
In ancient times, meditational yoga was practised in India on kusha grass, on hard earth without any cover, or on a rug of deer or tiger skin, as specified in the Bhagavadgita and the Shvetashvatara Upanishad as suitable for attaining enlightenment.

Seated in an easy posture, on a (deer or tiger) skin, placed on Kusha grass, worshipping Ganapati with fruits and sweetmeats, placing the right palm on the left, holding the throat and head in the same line, the lips closed and firm, facing the east or the north, the eyes fixed on the tip of the nose, avoiding too much food or fasting, the Nâdis should be purified, without which the practice will be fruitless.

— Shvetashvatara Upanishad, chapter II

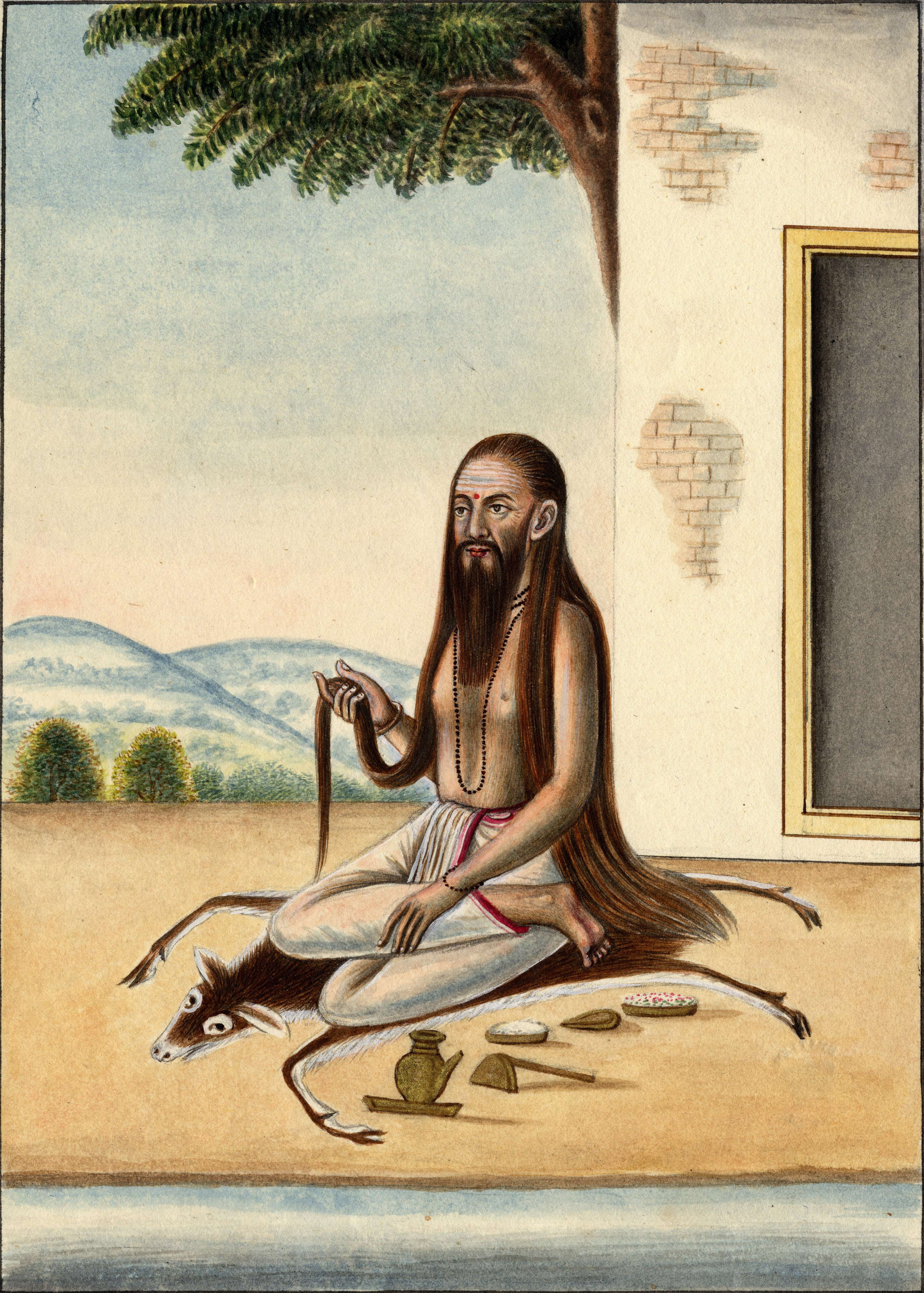
The sage Bharadvaja seated on a deer skin. Watercolour, early 19th century

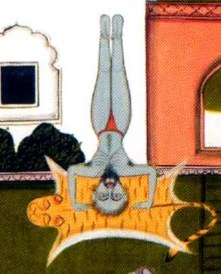
A yogi practising Kapala Asana (yoga headstand) on a tiger skin. Jogapradipika, 1830

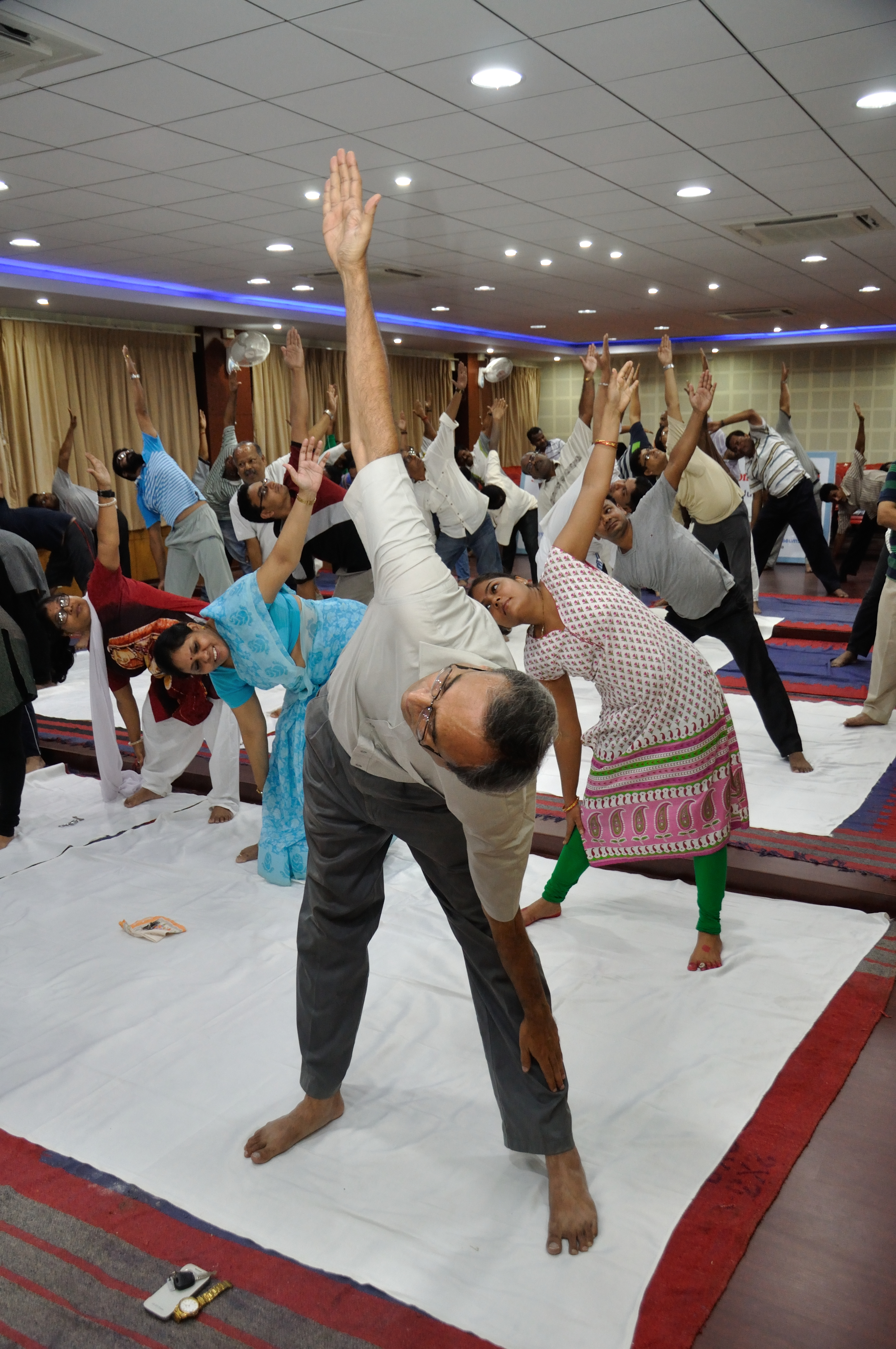
Participants in Trikonasana in the International Day of Yoga, Kolkata, 2015, on cotton sheets

=== Origin of the modern yoga mat ===
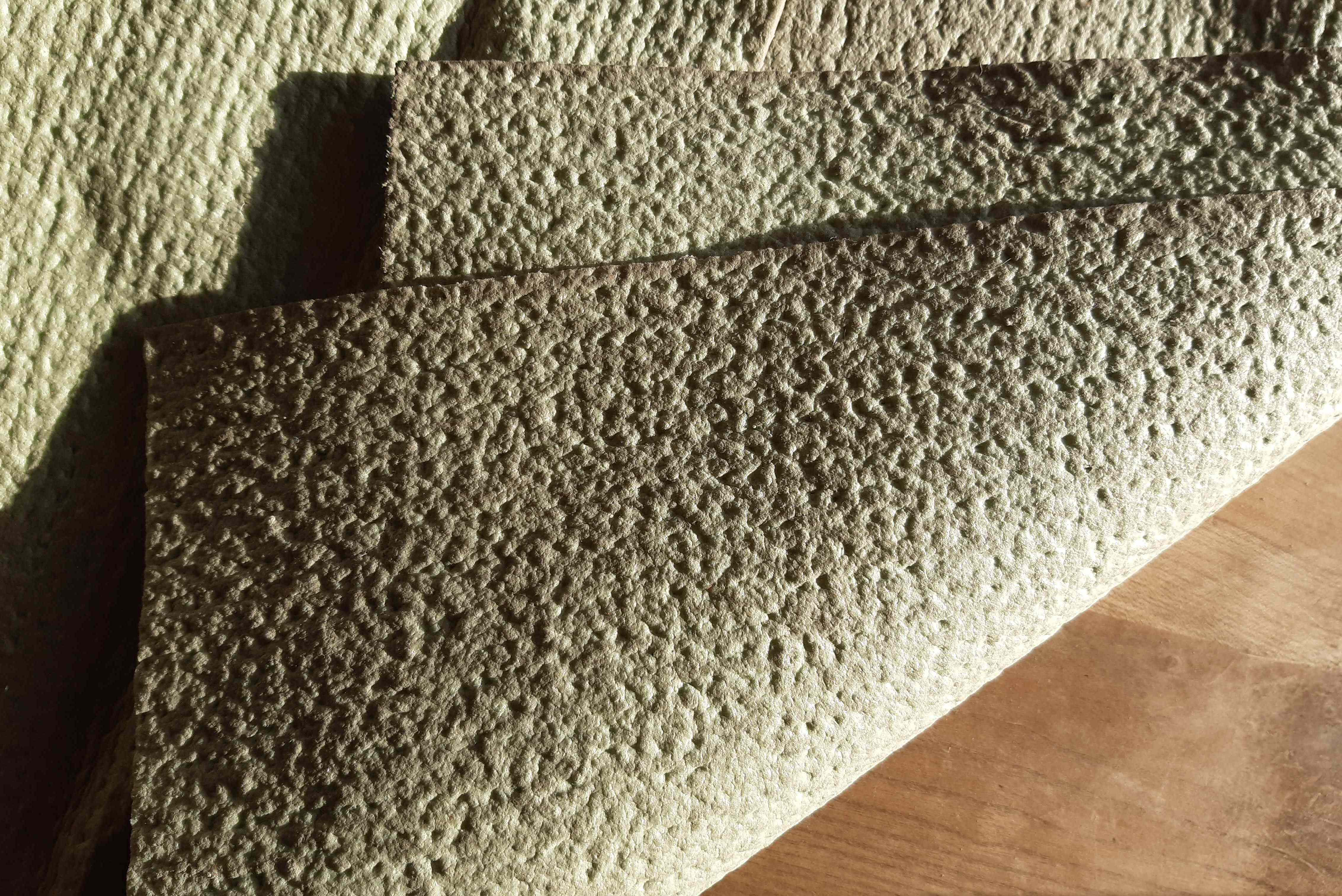
Old yoga mat from the 1980s made of carpet underlay

With yoga's introduction in the West, many practitioners used towels or cotton mats on wooden floors. Feet tended to skid on these surfaces, requiring strength just to stand still in a pose like Trikonasana. In 1982, while teaching yoga in Germany, Angela Farmer used carpet underlay cut to towel size during yoga classes; she returned home to London with the material. Angela's father, Richard Farmer, contacted the German padding manufacturer and became the first retailer of "sticky mats". The first, purpose-made yoga mat was manufactured and sold by Hugger Mugger Yoga Products in the 1990s; the company initially imported Farmer-style mats, but finding that they began to crumble with use, developed their own more robust alternative.

== Types ==
Yoga mats vary in thickness, composition, surface texture, "stickiness" or grip, and weight, as well as price. They are normally around 6 feet (180 cm) long and have a width of 2 feet (61 cm). Yoga mats range in thickness from lightweight 'travel' style at 1/16 inch (2 mm) to 1/8 inch (3 mm) (standard), and up to 1/4 inch (6 mm) for either high performance mats or soft mats for yoga therapy. Mats are available in many colours and patterns. "Alignment mats" are printed with guides to proper alignment, intended to help practitioners to place their feet the right distance apart and accurately in line with each other. Others are printed with images. Some travel mats can be folded into a small square.

The first commercially produced "sticky" yoga mats were made from PVC; they have a smooth surface, and tend to be cheaper. More recently, some supposedly "eco-friendly" mats are being made from natural jute, organic cotton, and rubber. PVC mats are the spongiest, resulting in more "give" when stepped on; fibre mats such as cotton and jute are the firmest. Jute mats are the roughest; "sticky" PVC mats give good grip, but some of the modern textured mats in other materials also grip well. Smooth mats provide the most grip, so are suitable for the more energetic styles such as hot yoga and Ashtanga (vinyasa) yoga; the trade-off is that they may be less comfortable and appear dirty more quickly. Mats with more padding are useful for styles such as yin yoga where poses are held for longer periods. Travel mats are thinner and lighter, but provide less padding.

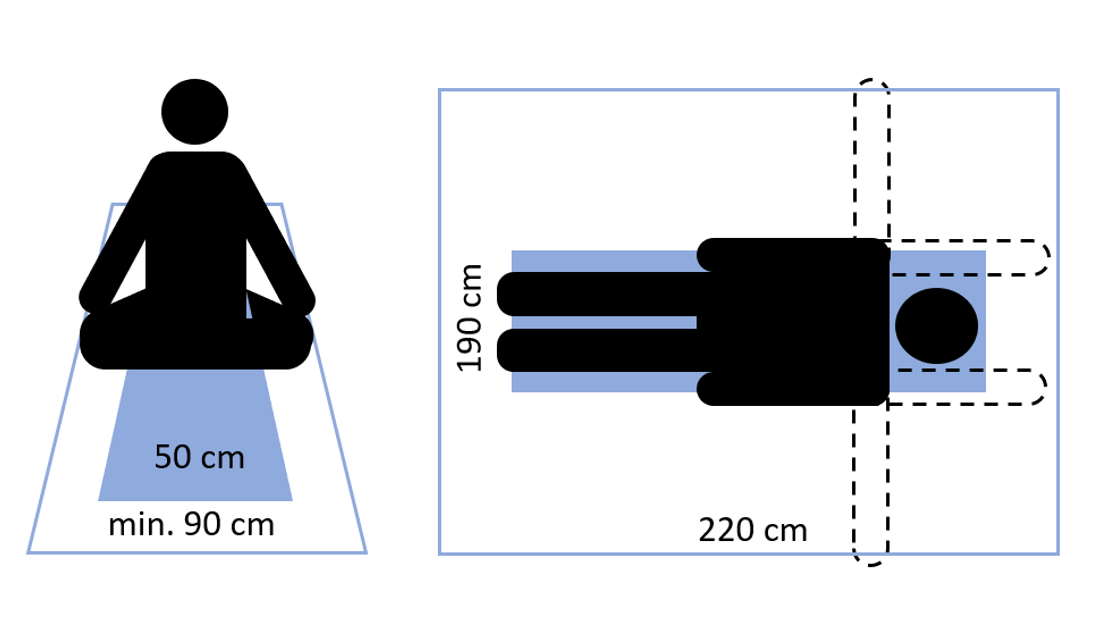
Standard rectangular yoga mats do not accommodate all possible positions within their area. Circular yoga mats, while unfamiliar, are helpful for sequences where the mat would need to be rotated through 90 degrees at intervals, and for demonstrating asanas to a class.

Some yoga practices in Scandinavia use cotton futon mats. They consist of a mattress, usually with pockets of cotton batting, sometimes with wool or polyester-cotton mixes, and a washable cover. They give good cushioning and grip. However, futons are much heavier than other mats, weighing as much as 4.7 kg.

Yoga Journal asked five yoga professionals for their views on yoga mats. They varied widely in their brand preferences, some choosing the traditional "sticky" type, but they agreed that mats must not be slippery. Katie Okamoto in The New York Times wrote in 2024 that she had used a natural rubber "Harmony Mat" by JadeYoga for ten years, buying a new one every few years; it provided "unbeatable performance, grip, and durability", regardless of sweat, and was "cushioned without being squishy", making it her top pick. However, she noted that it had a strong rubbery smell.

A hessian mat reviewed by The Independent gave good grip and was both comfortable and attractive; its rubber underside made it stable on any surface, but somewhat heavy; a cork mat provided both good grip and an exceptionally warm surface with a pleasant texture, and the property of being to some degree self-cleaning. The best grip was given by a smooth latex mat; in the review's opinion, its 4 mm thickness both gave enough padding for yin yoga, and the stability for energetic yoga styles. The review noted that a circular mat was at first unfamiliar, but helpful for personal practice of poses such as Prasārita Pādottānāsana (wide stance forward bend) and sequences where a rectangular mat would have to be turned through 90 degrees at intervals; it was also ideal for demonstrating asanas to a class.

Attributes of different types of yoga mat
Composition	Grip	Surface	Soft/firm	Weight	Durability	Cleanliness	Environmental impact	Cost
"Sticky" PVC (plastic)	Good	Smooth; Slightly sticky	Softer*	Light*	Tend to crumble	Tend to get dirty	High, not always recycled	Lowest
Rubber (latex)	Best	Smooth	Firm*	Heavy	Excellent	Easy to wipe clean Light colours show dirt	Low if natural and suitably sourced^{#}; high if combined with non-recyclable plastics e.g. polyurethane	High
Thermoplastic elastomer (TPE)	Good	Smooth	Firm	Very light	Good	Tend to get dirty	Sustainably made, recyclable	Mid
Cork on rubber	Good; Non-slip when wet	Smooth	Very comfortable, firm but warm	Heavier	Good	Mainly self-cleaning	Low if suitably sourced^{#}	High
Hessian (Jute) on rubber	Good	Rough weave Attractive texture	Very comfortable*	Heavier	Good	Washable	Low if suitably sourced^{#}	Mid
Hemp	Poor	Smooth weave	Firm; Softens with use	Light	Good, better than cotton	Washable	Low if suitably sourced^{#}	Mid
Cotton	Poor	Smooth weave	Firm	Light	Moderate, fibres wear out	Washable	Low if suitably sourced^{#}	Mid
Futon cotton with lining (cotton, wool, or polyester)	Good	Smooth	Softer	Very heavy	Good	Washable cover	Low if natural and suitably sourced^{#}	High

* Comfort and weight depend on thickness; people choose thinner mats for portability, or thicker ones for comfort.
^{#} Environmental impact of these products depends on how they are grown; impact will be low if they are grown with low usage of pesticides, or in the case of rubber, if from suitably certified forests.

== In popular culture ==
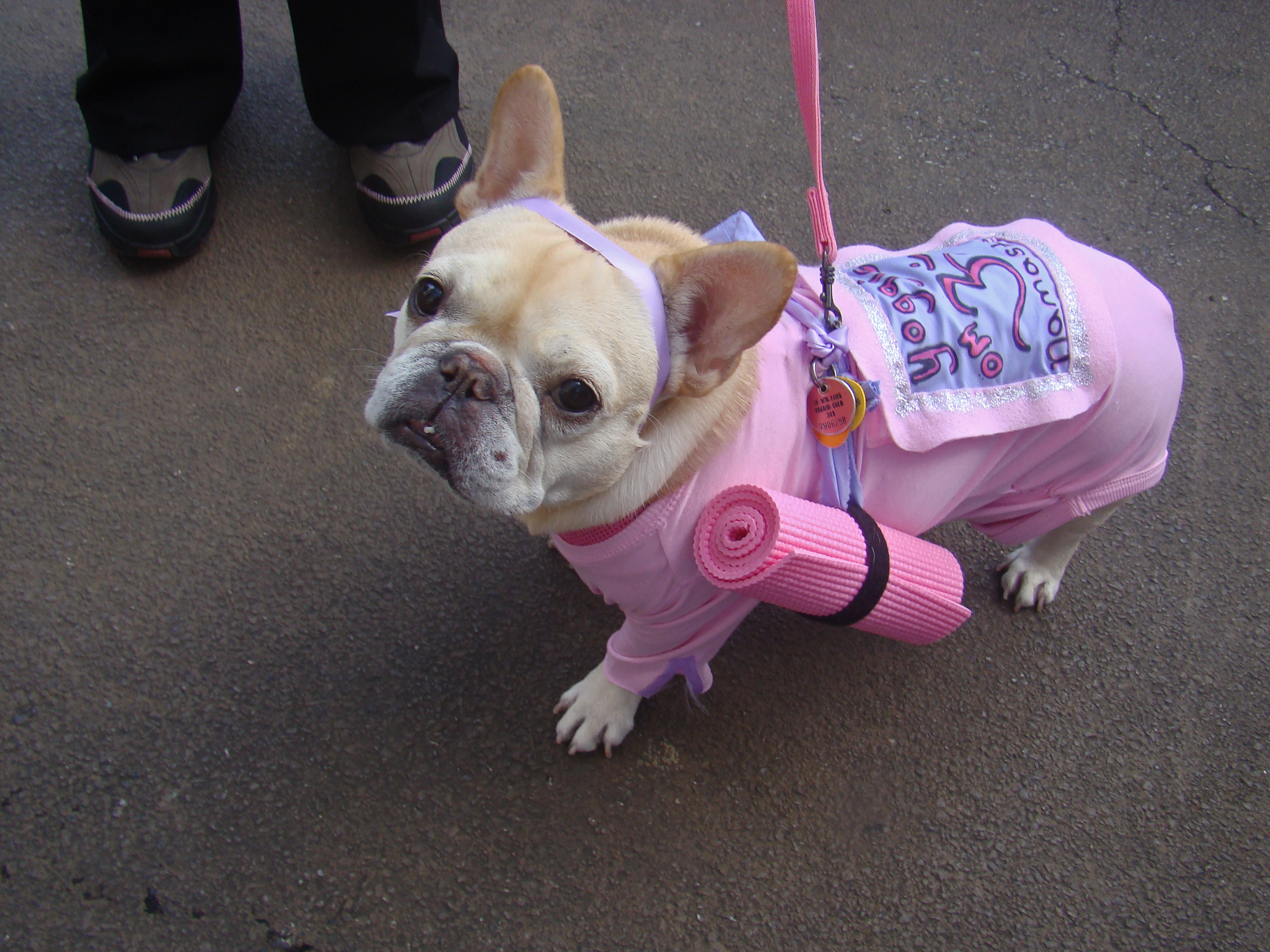
Dog in yoga costume complete with miniature yoga mat for the Carl Schurz Park Annual Halloween Howl, 2009, New York City

The yoga mat has become the definitive symbol of modern yoga as exercise. The yoga scholar Andrea Jain wrote in The Washington Post that "One of the most ubiquitous symbols of yoga's commercialization is the mat, which many consider a necessity to prevent slipping, to mark territory in crowded classes or to create a ritual space." She noted that "committed adherents" could pay over $100 for a luxury mat. The yoga scholar Noora-Helena Korpelainen agreed that the yoga mat had a ritual function: every Ashtanga Yoga session "starts with opening a yoga mat, taking a straight standing pose (samastitiḥ) and chanting a mantra. ... The practice ends with a mantra, relaxation, and rolling up the mat."

In 2025, The UK's Office for National Statistics decided to include the yoga mat in its "basket" of goods and services used to calculate inflation in the country. The items are chosen to represent typical consumer spending and hence to work out changes in the cost of living; the yoga mat's inclusion means that it has become a standard household purchase.

== See also ==
- Yoga in advertising
- Yoga brick
- Yoga pants
- Yoga using props
