= Huggermugger =

Huggermugger, hugger mugger or hugger-mugger may refer to:

- Huggermugger, a 1989 trivia board game.
- Huggermugger, a character from a fantasy book series by Christopher Pearse Cranch
- Huggermugger, a cartoon character by Dick Guindon
- HuggerMugger, a 1994 album by The September When
- Huggermugger, a 1997 play by Scot Williams
- Hugger Mugger (novel), a novel by Robert B. Parker
- Hugger Mugger (horse), a racehorse
- Hugger Mugger Yoga Products, a manufacturer of yoga and meditation products in Salt Lake City, Utah
- Hugger Mugger, a webtoon by Fox and Ros
