= Ardha chandrasana =

Standing posture in modern yoga

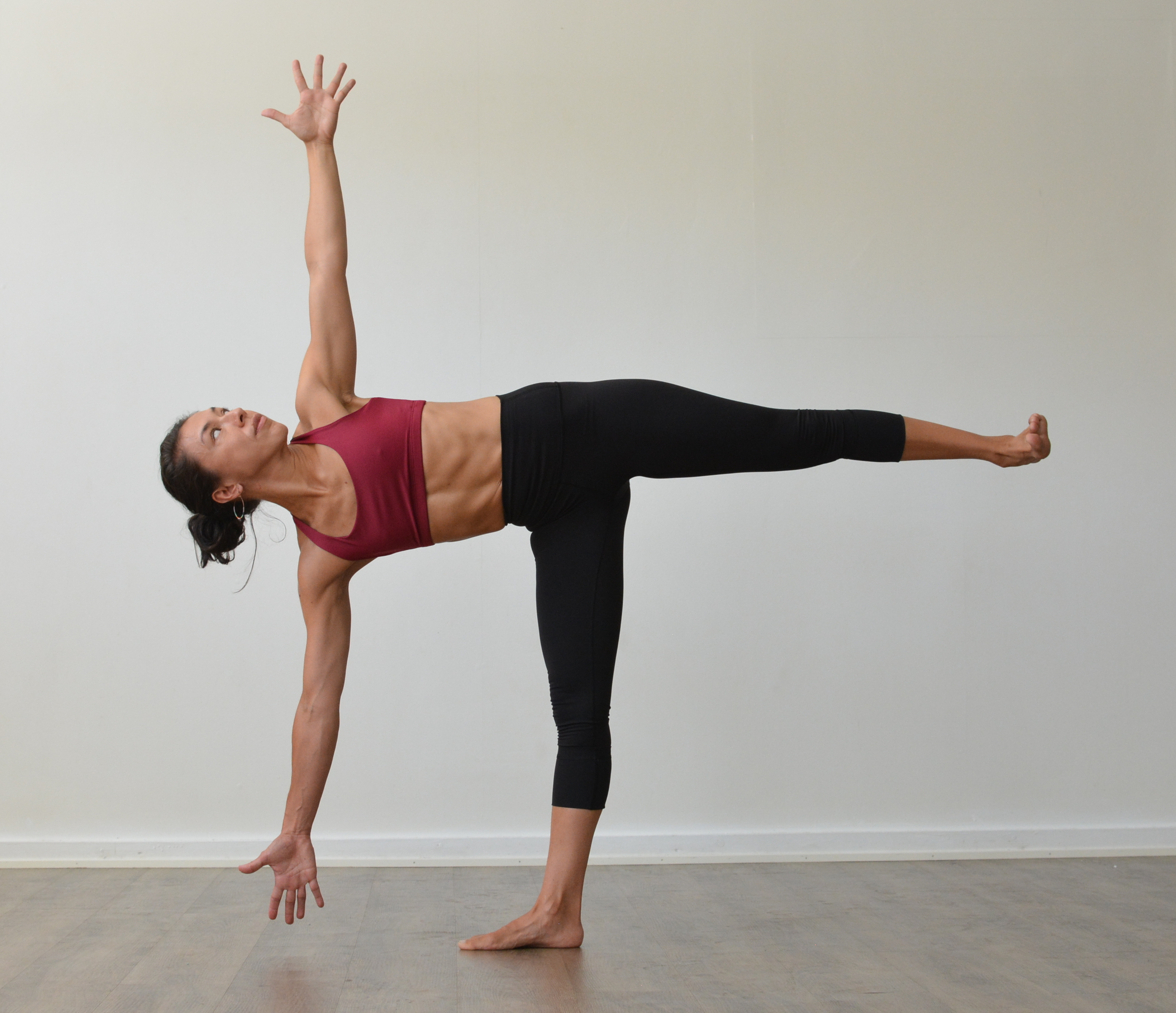
Ardha Chandrasana

Ardha Chandrasana (Sanskrit: अर्धचन्द्रासन; IAST: ardha chandrāsana) or Half Moon Pose is a standing asana in modern yoga as exercise.

== Etymology and origins ==
The name comes from the Sanskrit words अर्ध ardha meaning "half", चन्द्र chandra meaning "moon", and आसन āsana meaning "posture" or "seat".

The 19th century Sritattvanidhi uses the name Ardha Chandrasana for a different pose, Vrikshasana. Swami Yogesvarananda used the name in his 1970 First Steps to Higher Yoga for a pose similar to Kapotasana, Pigeon. The modern usage of the name is found in B. K. S. Iyengar's 1966 Light on Yoga.

== Practice and benefits ==
The pose is entered from Trikonasana (triangle pose), where one foot is kept forward. The arm opposite to the foot that is forward would come onto the hip. While stretching up with the rear leg and out with the front hand so that only the fingertips remain on the ground, the hand on the hip can gradually reach up towards the ceiling. The gaze is directed at the upper hand. However, Iyengar describes the pose with the upper hand resting on the hip.

The pose helps to strengthen the ankles and improve balance.

== Variations ==
- Parivrtta Ardha Chandrasana (Revolved Half Moon Pose) has the body revolved towards the standing leg.
- Baddha Parivrtta Ardha Chandrasana (Bound Revolved Half Moon Pose) has the body revolved towards the standing leg with arms bound around the standing leg.

== Other 'half moon' poses ==
In Sivananda Yoga and its derivative styles such as the Bihar School of Yoga, half moon pose is Anjaneyasana, an asana used in the moon salutation series (Chandra Namaskar).

In Bikram Yoga, the name "half moon pose" is given to a two-legged standing side bend, elsewhere called Indudalasana.

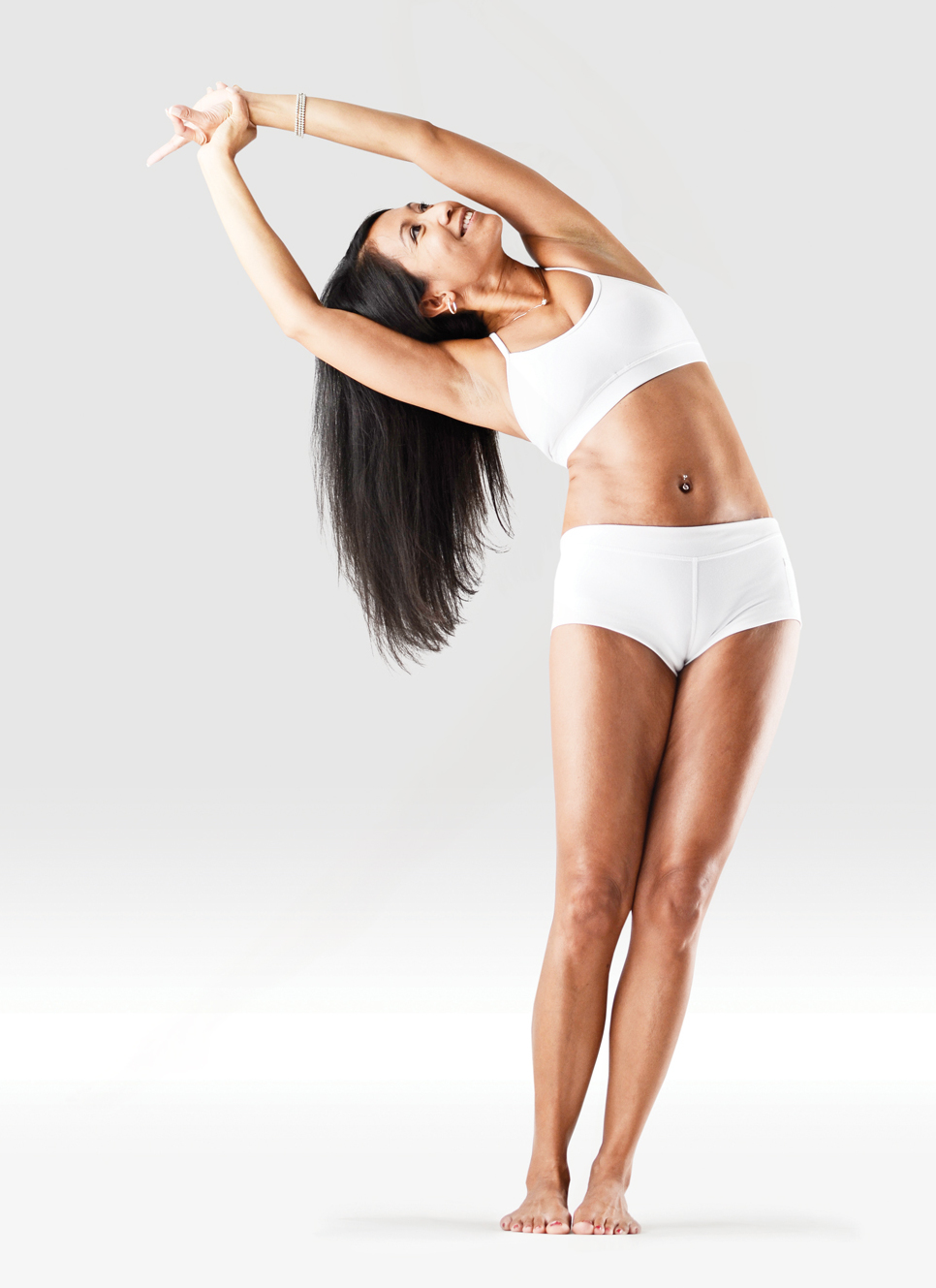
The side bend Indudalasana is known as "half moon pose" in Bikram Yoga.

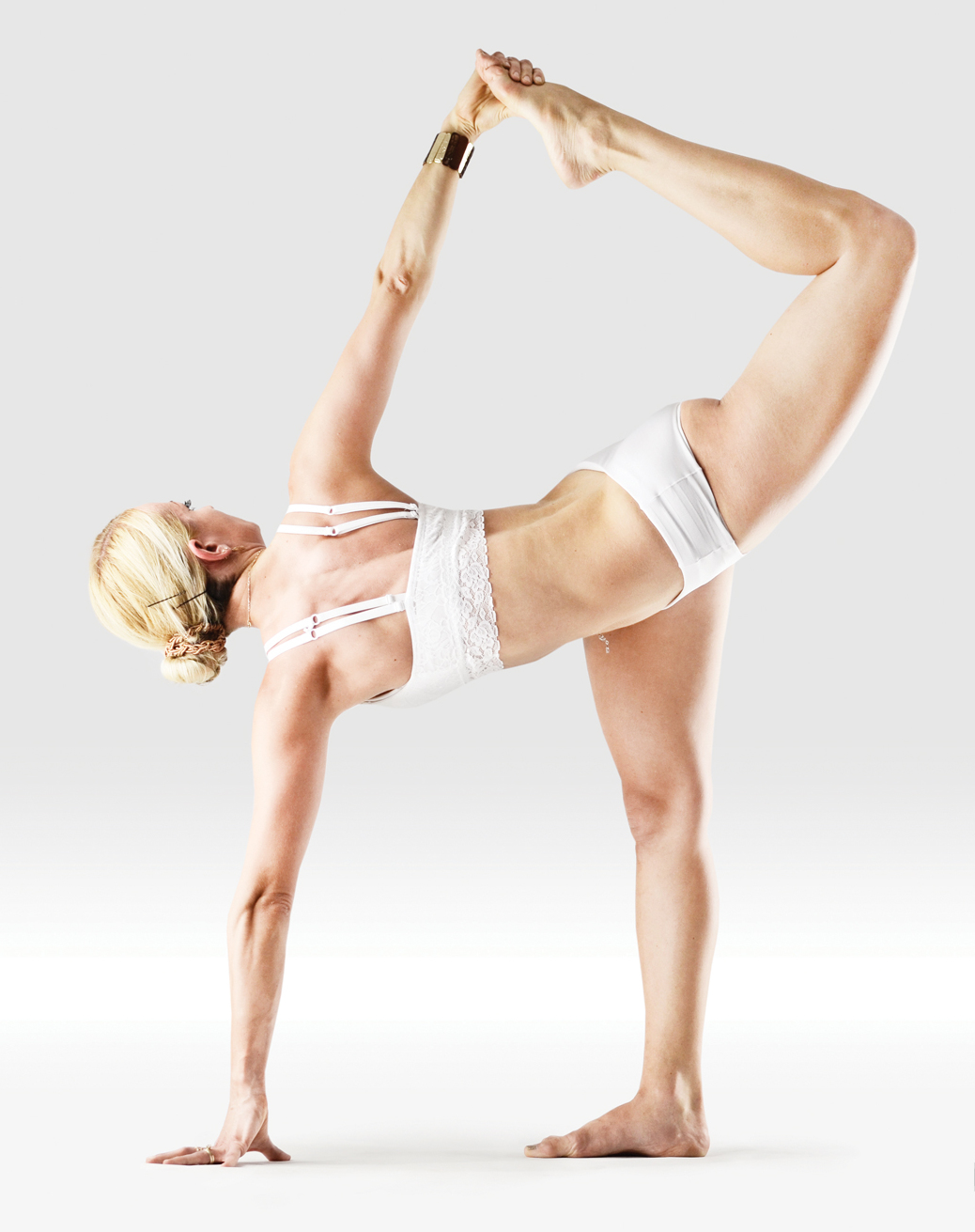
Revolved half moon pose, variation (grasping of foot)
