= Hasta Vinyasas =

Hasta Vinyasas (Sanskrit: हास्त विन्यास; Sanskrit pronunciation: [ɦaːstɐ ʋɪnjaːsɐ]; IAST:Hāsta Vinyāsa) are a set of yoga vinyasas that primarily involve movement of the arms.

The Hasta Vinyasas are: Parshvabhaga (Lateral Side Movement), Purvabhaga (Frontal Stretch), Prasarana (Sweeping Movement), Elbow Movement, Hands on Shoulder Blades Movements, Hands-Lock Behind Movements, Prishtanjali (Back Salute), and Shoulder Rotations.

== Etymology ==
Hasta Vinyasa is derived from Sanskrit: हास्त Hāsta, "formed with the hands", and Sanskrit: विन्यास Vinyāsa, "movement".

Below is a table of the Sanskrit etymology of the Hasta Vinyasas.

English Translation	IAST	Devanagari	Literal Meaning
Lateral Side Movement	Pārśvabhāga Vinyāsa	पार्श्वभाग विन्यास	side part
Frontal Stretch	Pūrvabhāga Vinyāsa	पूर्वभाग विन्यास	front part
Sweeping Movement	Prasaraṇa Vinyāsa	प्रसरण विन्यास	spreading forth, broadcast
Elbow Movement	–	–	–
Hands on Shoulder Blades Movements	–	–	–
Hands Lock Behind Body Movements	–	–	–
Reverse Prayer or Back Salute Movement	Paścima Namaskāra Vinyāsa or Pṛṣṭa Añjali	पश्चिम नमस्कारा or पृष्ट आञ्जलि	reverse prayer pose
Shoulder Rotations	–	–	–

== Description ==
This video demonstrates once cycle of each Hasta Vinyasa in sequence. In each section below, you can see examples of each individual vinyasa. (Please click fullscreen button to view.)

As vinyasas which have Tadasana as their base, the Hasta Vinyasas improve balance, and calm the mind (which also helps to produce a steady body) and ready a practitioner for asana practice. Simultaneously the movement of the Hasta Vinyasas help invigorate the body and prepare it for other asana practice.

When performing these vinyasas, all bandhas may be engaged, except in the backward bending vinyasas, where Jalandhara Bandha is not fully engaged.

Additionally, pranayama is of utmost importance during vinyasa practice. Breath and movement should be coordinated appropriately.

=== Parshvabhaga Vinyasa ===
Man performing Parshvabhaga Vinyasa.

The starting position for Parshvabhaga Vinyasa is Samasthitiḥ. While inhaling, stretch the arms straight to the sides and over the head, ending the inhale with the fingers interlaced and palms facing upward (this position is called Urdhva Baddhanguliyasana). As the palms are being turned out, the arms should be pulled upwards. After remaining in the stretch with the arms above the head for a moment, with the exhale, the hands are then brought out along sides back to Samasthitiḥ. The length of the upwards and downwards actions (and thus both inhale and exhale) should be equal, and long (perhaps, 5 seconds). It can be practiced a few times stretching more each time. Parshvabhaga Vinyasa primarily stretches the sides and the chest muscles. This movement provides a healthy stretch to thoracic cavity and rib structures, especially with a slight back bend.

=== Purvabhaga Vinyasa ===
Purvabhaga Vinyasa

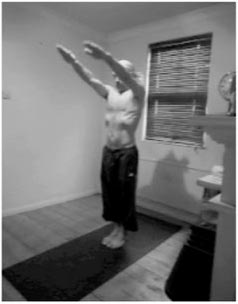
Image of man mid arm raise, while performing Purvabhaga Vinyasa. Note: The palms are down, arms near shoulder width, and raising to a palm forward position.

In this video a woman is performing one cycle of Purvabhaga Vinyasa. (Please click fullscreen button to view.)

Like Purvabhaga Vinyasa begins in Samasthitiḥ, but the hands are turned so the palms face backwards. As in Parshvabhaga Vinyasa, the arms are raised slow with the inhale. At the peak, the palms face forward. The breath may be held for a moment, before lowering the arms with the exhale; both breath and movement finishing simultaneously. This vinyasa can be performed a few times, progressively deepening the stretch.

=== Prasarana Vinyasa ===
This is a video of a woman performing one cycle of Prasarana Vinyasa. (Please click fullscreen to view.)

From a standing position (as in Samasthitiḥ) with the arms crossed palms on opposite thighs, swing the arms slowly out and up to shoulder height on their respective sides, hold for a moment, and return the hands. The movement, as with Parshvabhaga Vinyasa and Purvabhaga Vinyasa, is done inhaling up, and exhaling down, the motions beginning and ending with their appropriate breath. It can also be repeated a few times. Prasarana Vinyasa is a good chest opener, especially when breathing deeply.

=== Elbow Movement ===
Purvabhaga Vinyasa

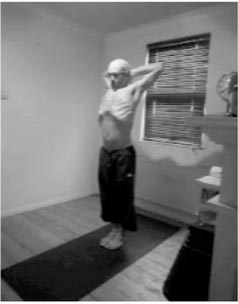
Image of man mid arm raise, while performing the Elbow Movement.

In this video a woman is performing one cycle of the Elbow Movements. (Please click fullscreen button to view.)

The Elbow Movement involves interlocking the fingers behind the base of the head (at the neck), with the arms raised and out to the sides. From standing (Samasthitiḥ) the arms are first raised above the head on the inhale, and then lowered on the exhale (fingers interlocked) to their place behind the head, with the chest open and shoulder blades adducted (moved towards the center; together). There is then a pause, and the hands are raised again while inhaling, and returned slowly to the sides with the exhale. This position should not be forced if the practitioner exhibits stiffness. The elbow movement can be repeated a few times before returning the hands to the sides, but always with the breath. Especially with a slight back bend, this position expands the thoracic cavity increasing lung capacity as well as stretching the intercostal muscles.

=== Hands on Shoulder Blades Movements ===
Hands On Shoulder Blades Movements

In this video the hands are on their opposite shoulder blade as per the Hands on Shoulder Blades Movement. (Please click fullscreen to view.)

In this video the hands are placed on their respective shoulder blades as per the Hands on Shoulder Blades Movement. (Please click fullscreen to view.)

Hands On Shoulder Blades Positions

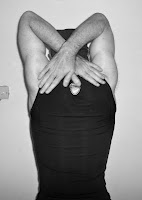
In this image the hands are on their opposite shoulder blade as per the Hands on Shoulder Blades Movement.

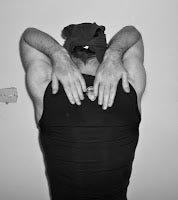
In this image the hands are placed on their respective shoulder blades as per the Hands on Shoulder Blades Movement.

There are two main "Hands on Shoulder Blades" hand positions. One with the hands on their respective shoulderblades, and the other with the hands on their opposite shoulder blades. Both positions are entered in the same way. From Samasthitiḥ, on the inhale, the hands are raised over the head, as in Parshvabhaga Vinyasa, and with the exhale the elbows are bent and the hands are brought behind the back (to their appropriate position). The position is held for between three and six full breaths (where one breath equals one inhale, and one exhale). To return to Samasthitiḥ, the arms are again raised on an inhale, and returned as in Parshvabhaga Vinyasa to the sides. Both movements open the chest, notably the pectoral muscles, and above the clavicles, and top area of the lungs.

=== Hands Lock Behind Body Movements ===
Hands Locked Behind Body with Hands at Elbows Vinyasa

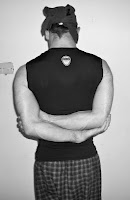
This is the hand position from which to perform the back bend.

Here Hands at Elbows Behind the Body vinyasa of the Hands Lock Behind Body Movements is performed. (Please click fullscreen button to view.)

Hands Locked Behind Body with Hands Interlocked Downward Vinyasa

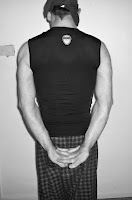
This is the hand position from which to perform the back bend.

Here the Hands Interlaced Palms Down vinyasa of the Hands Lock Behind Body Movements is performed. (Please click fullscreen to view.)

These are two different positions: One with the hands interlaced palms down behind the body, and the other with the hands at the elbows behind the body. They can both be practiced with minor back bends. Both are entered in the same way (as with other Hasta Vinyasas): From Samasthitiḥ, raise the hands on an inhale as in Parshvabhaga Vinyasa, and lower with the exhale to the appropriate hand position. When exiting these positions, the hands are simply returned to the sides (to Samasthitiḥ) and not brought back up above the head.

==== Hands at Elbows Behind the Body ====
One hand clasps the elbow from the inside (palm on the side of the elbow which is toward the body), and the other under the opposite bent elbow. When practiced as an Hasta Vinyasa, a minor back-bend can be performed starting on an inhale after entering the pose. When back-bending, the chest is lifted, shoulders dropped, and shoulder blades brought inward. There is then a pause with the breath held for a moment, and on the exhale one returns to standing (or Sanskrit: sthitiḥ). This back bending series is repeated 3–6 times. This hand position can also be applied to other asanas, such as uttanasana, as well as backward bending poses.

==== Hands Interlaced Palms Down ====
In the position the fingers are interlaced with the palms facing downward, arms behind the back. A back bend is initiated on the inhale, with care taken to lift the chest up, and bring the shoulders down (adducting the scapula). The posture is held for three to six breaths before returning with an exhale to a standing position. This position stretches the chest, and facilitates back-bending.

=== Reverse Prayer Vinyasa ===
Pṛṣṭa Añjali (A.K.A. Pashcima Namaskara) Vinyasa

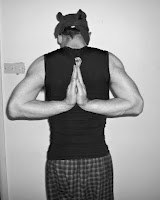
This is Pashcima Namaskara, the hand position from which to perform the back-bend in for this vinyasa.

This is a video of woman performing Pṛṣṭa Añjali Vinyasa . (Please click fullscreen to view.)

When performing Pashcima Namaskara Vinyasa (Reverse Prayer Vinyasa) or Pṛṣṭa Añjali (Back Salute) the arms are raised on an inhale, as in Parshvabhaga Vinyasa,. On the exhale, they are brought, palms together to the bottom of the spine and slid upwards. All other aspects of the hand and arm position correspond with Pashcima Namaskarasana (Reverse Prayer Pose). A back-bend can be added on the inhale in a similar fashion as with Hands at Elbows Behind the Body (on the inhale, repeated three to six times). After all, placing the hands on the elbows is considered a modification of Pashcima Namaskarasana.

=== Shoulder Rotation Vinyasas ===
This video includes both shoulder rotations back to back.

There are two Hasta Vinyasas for shoulder rotation: One is a back bend with hands over the head, followed by a simultaneous return to standing, and movement of the arms toward the front. The other is an arm movement lowering the arms and from above the head, and then opening horizontally to the sides.

==== Back Bending Shoulder Rotation ====
Beginning with the fingers interlaced (palms out) above the head (as at the apex of Parshvabhaga Vinyasa), a back-bend is performed on the inhale. On the following exhale, the arms are brought around the sides to the front in an arc, ending palms up in front of the body.

==== Upright Shoulder Rotation ====
With the hands beginning above the head, palms facing forward, roughly shoulder width apart (as at the apex of Purvabhaga Vinyasa), the arms are lowered on an exhale to shoulder level (ending with the palms down).

== Style of Yoga ==
The Hasta Vinyasas originate from Vinyasa Krama Yoga.

== Sources ==
- Ramaswami, Srivatsa (2005). The Complete Book of Vinyasa Yoga. Da Capo Press. ISBN 978-1-56924-402-9.
- Kaminoff, Leslie (2007). Yoga Anatomy. The Breath Trust. ISBN 978-0-7360-6278-7.
- Coulter, H. David (2001). Anatomy of Hatha Yoga. Body and Breath. ISBN 978-0-9707006-0-5.
- Fitz-Simon, Witold (2010). "Arm Variations: Pashchima Namaskarasana". Yoga Art and Science. Archived from the original on September 22, 2008.
