= Tadasana =

Standing pose in modern yoga

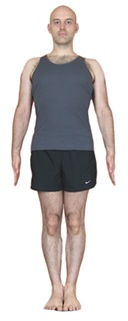
Tadasana or Mountain pose

Tadasana (Sanskrit: ताड़ासन, romanized: Tāḍāsana), Mountain pose or Samasthiti (Sanskrit: समस्थिति; IAST: samasthitiḥ) is a standing asana in modern yoga as exercise; it is not described in medieval hatha yoga texts. It is the basis for several other standing asanas.

== Etymology and origins ==
Tāḍāsana is from the Sanskrit words ताड tāḍa, "mountain" and आसन āsana meaning "posture" or "seat". Samasthitiḥ is from सम sama meaning "equal", "level", or "balanced"; and स्थिति sthiti, "standing".

The pose was unknown in hatha yoga until the 20th century Light on Yoga, but it appears in the 1896 Vyayama Dipika, a manual of gymnastics, as part of the "very old" sequence of danda (Sanskrit for "staff" or "stick") exercises. Norman Sjoman suggests that it was among the poses adopted into modern yoga as exercise in Mysore by Krishnamacharya to form the "primary foundation" for his vinyasas with flowing movements between poses. The pose was then taken up by his pupils Pattabhi Jois and B. K. S. Iyengar, into their worldwide Ashtanga (vinyasa) yoga and Iyengar Yoga styles respectively.

== Description ==
Tadasana is the basic standing asana on which many other poses are founded. The feet are together and the hands are at the sides of the body. The posture is entered by standing with the feet together, grounding evenly through the feet and lifting up through the crown of the head. The thighs are lifted, the waist is lifted, and the spine is elongated. The breathing is relaxed. It is used in some schools of yoga in between other poses, to allow the body and consciousness to integrate the experience of the preceding asana and to prepare for the next.

== Variations ==
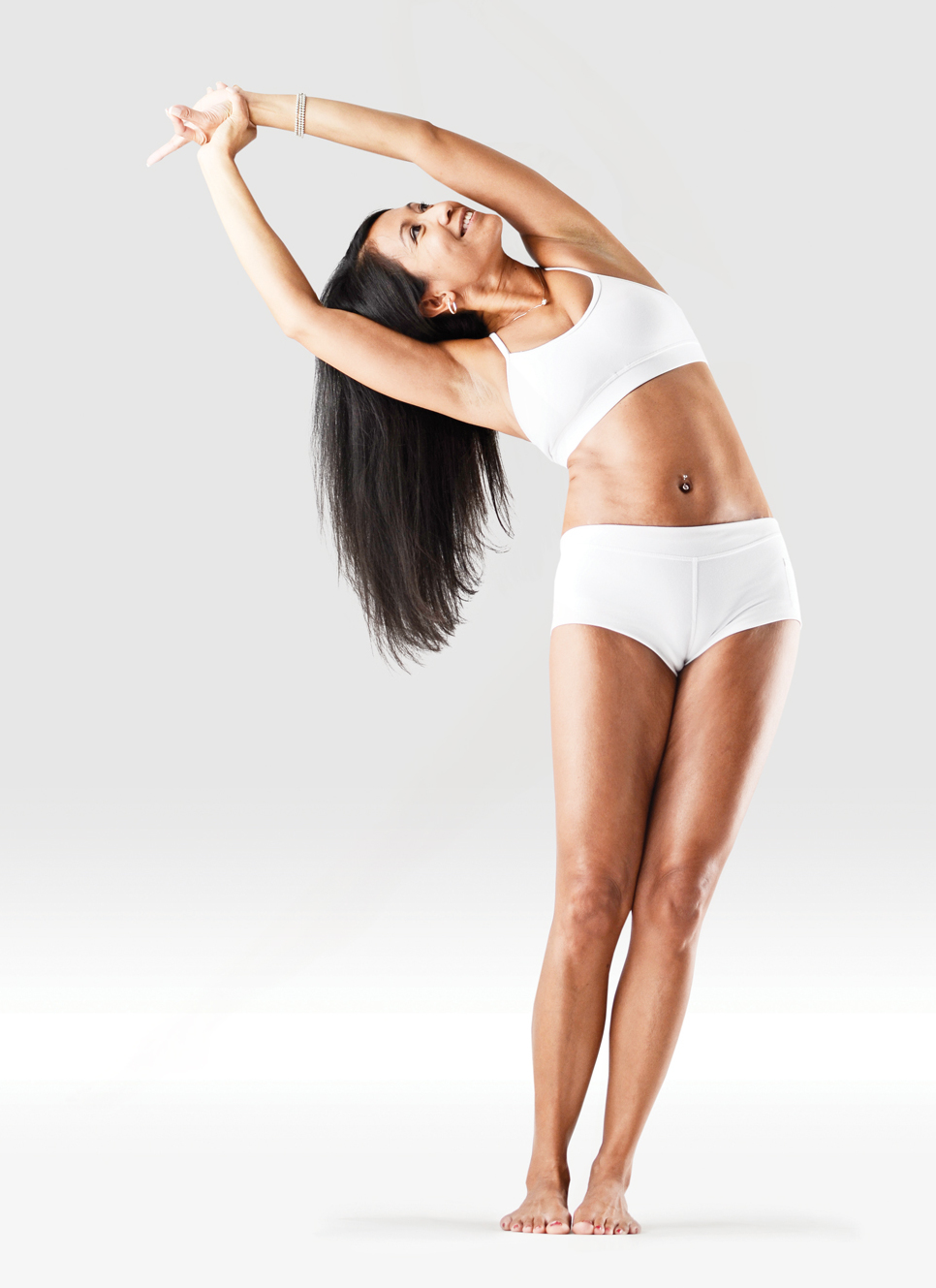
Variations include the side bend Indudalasana, one of the asanas sometimes called Half Moon Pose.

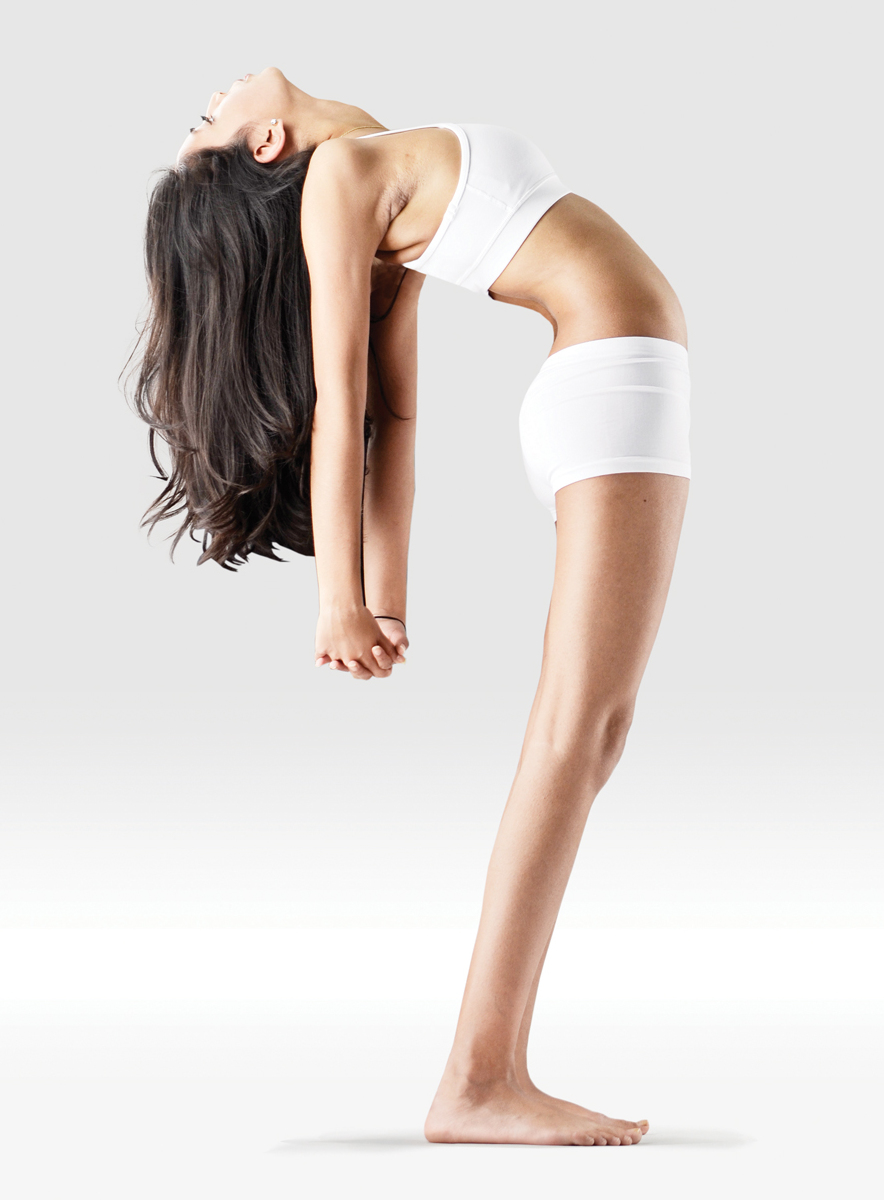
Standing in a back bend gives the Standing Locust Pose, Stiti Shalabhasana.

Placing the feet wider is common in vinyasa styles of yoga and provides a more stable base in this and other such standing asanas.

Namaskarasana, Pranamasana, or Prayer Pose has the hands in prayer position (Anjali mudra) in front of the chest.

Pashchima Namaskarasana or Reverse Prayer Pose has the hands in prayer position behind the back.

Urdhva Vrikshasana, also called Urdhva Hastasana or upward tree pose, has the hands stretched straight upwards, and the gaze is upward to the Angusthamadhye Drishti (thumbs). The pose occurs twice in Ashtanga Yoga's Surya Namaskar A.

Parshvasana (Side Stretch Pose), also called Indudalasana, known from 1968, has the arms lifted and the body stretched over to one side.

Anuvittasana or Hasta Uttanasana (Standing Back Bend), has the arms raised and the back arched. An extreme form of the pose is Tiryang Mukhottanasana, in which the back bend is sufficient to enable the hands to grasp the ankles.

Some reclining asanas such as Supta Tadasana (Reclined Mountain Pose) stem from Tadasana.

=== Iyengar Yoga ===
Iyengar Yoga considers Tadasana pivotal as the foundation of most standing asanas. It teaches practitioners to balance the weight equally on the two feet.The feet are placed together, the shins and thighs are aligned, and the chest is lifted. The pose is not distinguished from Samasthitih. The arms can be raised over the head or kept at the sides of the legs. It appears in the 1st and 2nd weeks of Iyengar's āsana courses as detailed in Light on Yoga.

=== Ashtanga Vinyasa Yoga ===
In Ashtanga Vinyasa Yoga, Tadasana is performed on the toes, while Samasthitiḥ is flat footed. In this style of yoga the two āsanas are different. Samasthitiḥ is the centerpiece of the standing sequence and the foundation for the:

- Hasta Vinyasas (arm vinyasas)
- Parsva Bhangi (side vinyasas)
- Uttanasana (forward bending vinyasas), and
- squatting/hip stretching asanas

In the standing sequence, the final asana of the series (before Savasana) is Tadasana, performed on the toes. In this school of yoga, Tadasana is the beginning and ending asana in the warm-up Surya Namaskar sequence. It is sometimes interspersed throughout Ashtanga Series when full vinayasas are used, and it is the foundational pose for all standing asanas. The Nasagra Drishti at the tip of the nose is considered the correct drishti for Tadasana. Sushumna drishti is encouraged to draw the awareness inward. The school considers Uddiyana bandha, Mula Bandha and Jalandhara Bandha appropriate for Tadasana.

== See also ==
- List of asanas
- Kayotsarga

== Sources ==
- Iyengar, B. K. S. (2005). Illustrated Light on Yoga. HarperCollins. ISBN 978-81-7223-606-9.
- Sinha, S. C. (1996). Dictionary of Philosophy. Anmol Publications. ISBN 978-81-7041-293-9.
- Kaminoff, Leslie (2007). Yoga Anatomy. The Breath Trust. ISBN 978-0-7360-6278-7.
- Ramaswami, Srivatsa (2005). The Complete Book of Vinyasa Yoga. Da Capo Press. ISBN 978-1-56924-402-9.
- Maehle, Gregor (2011). Ashtanga Yoga Practice and Philosophy. New World Library. ISBN 978-1-57731-986-3.
- Steiner, Ronald P. (2012). "AshtangaYoga.info".
- Ranjini, V. V.; et al. (2012). "SpokenSanskrit Dictionary".
- Fitz-Simon, Witold (2010). "Yoga Art and Science". Archived from the original on 13 October 2007.
