= Mira Mehta =

Iyengar Yoga teacher

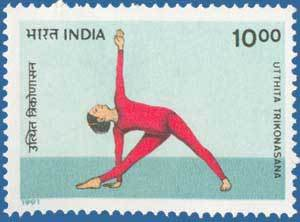
- Demonstrating Trikonasana on a 1991 ten-rupee Indian postage stamp
- Occupations: yoga teacher, author
- Known for: Yoga the Iyengar Way

Mira Mehta is a yoga teacher in England. She is known for the 1990 book Yoga the Iyengar Way. In 1991, she appeared on a set of Indian postage stamps. She was included in the "Best of British Women 1993" for her work in alternative health. She has been described as one of the "yoga greats".

== Life ==
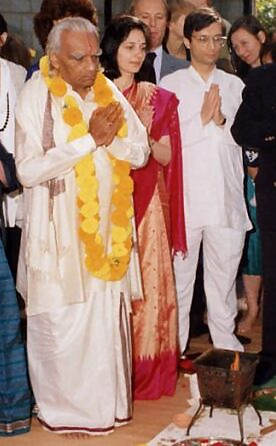
Mira and Shyam Mehta with B. K. S. Iyengar at the opening of a new yoga studio at Maida Vale, London, 1994

Mira Mehta earned her B.A. degree in linguistics and anthropology at the University of London. She gained an M.Phil. degree in Sanskrit and classical Indian religion at the University of Oxford. She continued her studies of ancient yoga texts as a postgraduate under Krishna Arjunwadkar.

She learnt yoga directly from B. K. S. Iyengar from an early age, through "frequent visits" to his yoga institute in Pune. She had a scoliosis which she gradually overcame with yoga, becoming a full-time Iyengar Yoga teacher at the Iyengar Yoga Institute in Maida Vale, London. She gained Iyengar's advanced yoga teaching certificate and has taught in different countries including Spain. She describes herself as knowledgeable in asana, pranayama, yoga philosophy, and therapy."

In 1999, Mehta founded "The Yogic Path", a yoga studio with classes of 20 students in West Hampstead, London. It teaches Iyengar Yoga and philosophy as well as therapy yoga and yoga for back pain. She has published a poetry collection, Cascade of Stars, and translations of Sanskrit poetry.

== Honours and distinctions ==
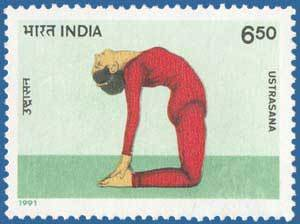
Mehta in Ustrasana on a 1991 Indian postage stamp

Mira and her brother Shyam Mehta appeared on a set of 4 stamps issued by the Indian Department of Posts in 1991. She was depicted demonstrating Ustrasana (camel pose) on a 6.50 rupee stamp, and Trikonasana (triangle pose) on a 10 rupee stamp. The images, redrawn from photographs in the Mehtas' 1990 book Yoga the Iyengar Way, were described as "perfect postures".

In 1993, she was included in the "Best of British Women 1993" for her work in alternative health.

The yoga teacher Barry Chapple, writing in The Hindu in 2015, described Mehta as one of the "yoga greats".

== Books ==
=== Yoga ===
Mehta's yoga books have all been translated from English into multiple languages.

- Mehta, Silva; Mehta, Mira; Mehta, Shyam (1990). Yoga the Iyengar Way. Dorling Kindersley.
- Mehta, Mira (1994). How to use Yoga. Rodmell Press.
- Mehta, Mira (2002). Health through Yoga. Thorsons.
- Mehta, Mira; Arjunwadkar, Krishna S. (2004). Yoga Explained. Kyle Cathie.

=== Poetry ===
- Mehta, Mira (2002). Cascade of Stars. Shepheard-Walwyn.
- Mehta, Mira (2010). "Readings for Serenity". Yogic Path. Archived from the original on 2 November 2012. (48 translations from Sanskrit)

== Reception ==
In his foreword to Yoga the Iyengar Way, Iyengar wrote that he was "pleased to be associated with this work of my pupils." The journalist and yoga teacher Ann Pizer, writing on Very Well Fit, comments that many practitioners see the book as a complement to Iyengar's own Light on Yoga, and that the combination of big colour illustrations and "explicit alignment points" actually make it rather more approachable. The yoga teacher and journalist Marina Jung, writing in Australian Yoga Life, called the book a "bestseller" and "highly influential throughout the world".

Madhavi Kolhatkar, reviewing Yoga Explained for Annals of the Bhandarkar Oriental Research Institute, writes that the book sets the practice of asanas in the context of the Yoga Sutras of Patanjali. Each unit of the book presents an asana, a page on the Yoga Sutras, and a section on philosophy.
