= Yoga the Iyengar Way =

1990 guide to Iyengar Yoga, a style of modern yoga

- Cover of first edition, showing Mira Mehta in Utthita Trikonasana. The title appears also in Sanskrit as Yoga Marg.
- Authors: Silva, Mira & Shyam Mehta
- Subject: Iyengar Yoga
- Publisher: Dorling Kindersley
- Publication date: 1990
- ISBN: 978-0863184208

Yoga the Iyengar Way is a 1990 guide to Iyengar Yoga, a style of modern yoga as exercise, by the yoga teachers Silva Mehta and her children Mira Mehta and Shyam Mehta. They were among the first teachers to be trained by B. K. S. Iyengar outside India.

The main part of the book is on asanas, yoga postures. This is accompanied by an introduction to yoga, and sections on pranayama (yoga breathing), the philosophy of yoga, the surrender of the self including meditation, and recommended courses of asanas for different conditions. The book presents the asanas with a combination of a brief text and photographs of Mira and Shyam on a single page or a double-page spread.

The book has been well received by critics, who have called it "an influential classic textbook"; its publisher describes it as a "backlist bestseller". The authors have been portrayed in some of the asanas illustrated in the book in a set of Indian postage stamps.

== Context ==
At the time of the book's publication, Silva, Mira, and Shyam Mehta were teachers of Iyengar Yoga at the Iyengar Yoga Institute in Maida Vale, London. Silva, mother of Shyam and Mira, records that she had a crush fracture of the spine at age 25, leading to osteoarthritis. Yoga with B. K. S. Iyengar relieved the pain, and she went on to work helping people with physical problems to practise remedial yoga. Shyam and Mira learnt yoga from Iyengar from an early age. Shyam states that yoga has given him determination and the ability to concentrate on office work. Mira had a scoliosis which she gradually overcame with yoga, eventually becoming a full-time yoga teacher. Silva ran the first yoga teacher training program approved by the Inner London Education Authority, from 1970. Mira has been called "the most senior [Iyengar] Yoga teacher outside India, recognised as an authority in all its aspects: asana, pranayama, philosophy and therapy."

== Book ==
=== Publication history ===
Yoga the Iyengar Way was published in paperback by Dorling Kindersley (London) in 1990. It was reprinted in 2006 by A. A. Knopf (New York) and distributed by Random House, who describe it as a "backlist bestseller". The book has been translated into Dutch, French, German, Korean, and Spanish.

=== Topics covered ===
The book closely integrates text and photographs, showing how to enter the pose, here Virabhadrasana I, how to work within it, and how to use props such as yoga bricks to work correctly if the pose is found difficult. The effect is "rather more approachable" than Iyengar's own presentation.

The book is arranged with an introductory section, three main parts, and an appendix.

- The introductory section contains a foreword by B. K. S. Iyengar; a short biographical preface by the authors; a short introduction to yoga in general; and a note on Sanskrit transliteration.
- Part I is the main part of the book, with some 140 pages covering about 100 asanas. (Note: Mehta, Mehta & Mehta 1990, pp. 12–152)
- Part II covers techniques for the mind, including pranayama (yoga breathing) and the philosophy of yoga. (Note: Mehta, Mehta & Mehta 1990, pp. 154–170)
- Part III describes the surrender of the self and meditation, dhyana. (Note: Mehta, Mehta & Mehta 1990, pp. 172–174)
- The appendix defines courses of asanas considered suitable for different conditions, with a set of remedial programmes. (Note: Mehta, Mehta & Mehta 1990, pp. 175–187)

=== Approach ===
Each asana is described with a combination of short paragraphs of text and photographs (about half in colour) of Shyam or Mira Mehta. The book is in a large format, 215 mm × 275 mm (8.5 in × 10.8 in), close to A4 size, allowing for a large photograph of each asana together with several smaller ones showing details and stages for entering the pose. Some of the key Iyengar Yoga asanas such as Utthita Trikonasana are given a double-page spread; others get a single page.

Each pose is named in Sanskrit (in a pale colour, giving the effect of a decorative frieze at the top of the page) and in transliteration with diacritic marks. Below that is an explanation of the meaning of the Sanskrit words, and a brief summary of what the pose achieves. Utthita Trikonasana is described in three steps, each with a small photograph the width of a column of text. A pair of small detail photographs show how to hold the ankle or to use a yoga brick for support. A 'focus' section instructs points to note in the pose. An inset photograph in the main image gives a back view, complete with detailed instructions in the caption for the attention needed to the back in the pose. A final 'Work in the posture' section instructs on the movements required to achieve a good posture in the asana.

== Reception ==
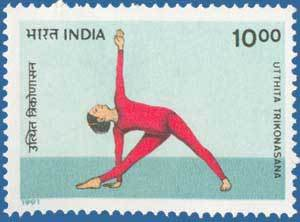
1991 ten-rupee Indian postage stamp marked "Utthita trikonasana"

The scholar of religion Andrea Jain, in her study of the sociology of yoga, describes the Mehtas as "a family of senior Iyengar Yoga teachers." Yoga Matters calls Yoga the Iyengar Way "an influential classic textbook." The journalist and yoga teacher Ann Pizer, writing on Very Well Fit, rated it the best overall runner-up yoga book of 2019, writing that "the photos may look a little dated because of the unitards. However, they're almost preferable to the 'sexy' photos so often seen in more recent books." Pizer comments that many practitioners see the book as a complement to Iyengar's own Light on Yoga, and that the combination of big colour illustrations and "explicit alignment points" actually make it rather more approachable. The yoga teacher and journalist Marina Jung, writing in Australian Yoga Life, called the book a "bestseller" and "highly influential throughout the world".

The book's authors and their exemplary asanas are commemorated in a set of Indian postage stamps. Mira and Shyam appeared on a set of 4 stamps issued by the Indian Department of Posts in 1991: Shyam wearing blue in Bhujangasana on a 2 rupee stamp, and in Dhanurasana on a 5 rupee stamp; Mira wearing red in Ustrasana on a 6.50 rupee stamp, and in Utthita Trikonasana on a 10 rupee stamp; the images, all redrawn from photographs in the book, were described as "perfect postures".

== Sources ==
- Mehta, Silva; Mehta, Mira; Mehta, Shyam (1990). Yoga the Iyengar Way: The new definitive guide to the most practised form of yoga. Dorling Kindersley. ISBN 978-0863184208.
