= Trikonasana =

Standing yoga pose

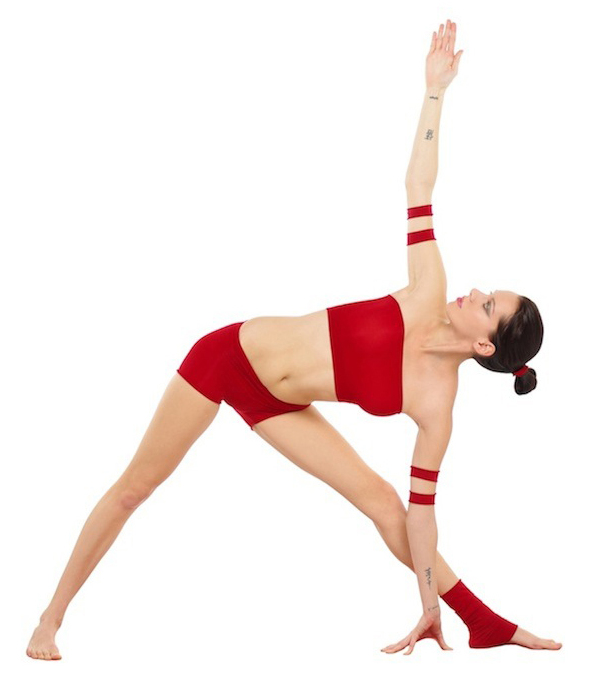
Trikonasana variant with lower hand in front of the leg

Trikonasana or Utthita Trikonasana (Sanskrit: उत्थित त्रिकोणासन; IAST: utthita trikoṇāsana), [Extended] Triangle Pose is a standing asana in modern yoga as exercise. Variations include Baddha Trikonasana (bound triangle pose) and Parivrtta Trikonasana (revolved triangle pose).

== Etymology and origins ==
The name comes from the Sanskrit words utthita (उत्थित), "extended", trikoṇa (त्रिकोण) "triangle", and āsana (आसन) "posture" or "seat".

The pose is first described in the 20th century, appearing in the teaching of Tirumalai Krishnamacharya, including his 1934 book Yoga Makaranda, and in the works of his students.

== Description ==
Working in Trikonasana using a yoga brick

Trikonasana is performed in two parts, facing left, and then facing right. The practitioner begins standing with the feet one leg-length apart, knees unbent, turns the right foot completely to the outside and the left foot less than 45 degrees to the inside, keeping the heels in line with the hips. The arms are spread out to the sides, parallel to the ground, palms facing down; the trunk is extended as far as is comfortable to the right, while the arms remain parallel to the floor. Once the trunk is fully extended to the right, the right arm is dropped so that the right hand reaches the shin (or a block or on the floor) to the front (left side) of the right foot, with the palm down if flexed. The left arm is extended vertically, and the spine and trunk are gently twisted counterclockwise (i.e., upwards to the left, since they're roughly parallel to the floor), using the extended arms as a lever, while the spine remains parallel to the ground. The arms are stretched away from one another, and the head may be turned to gaze at the left thumb, slightly intensifying the spinal twist. Returning to standing, the pose is repeated to the left.

== Stylistic differences ==
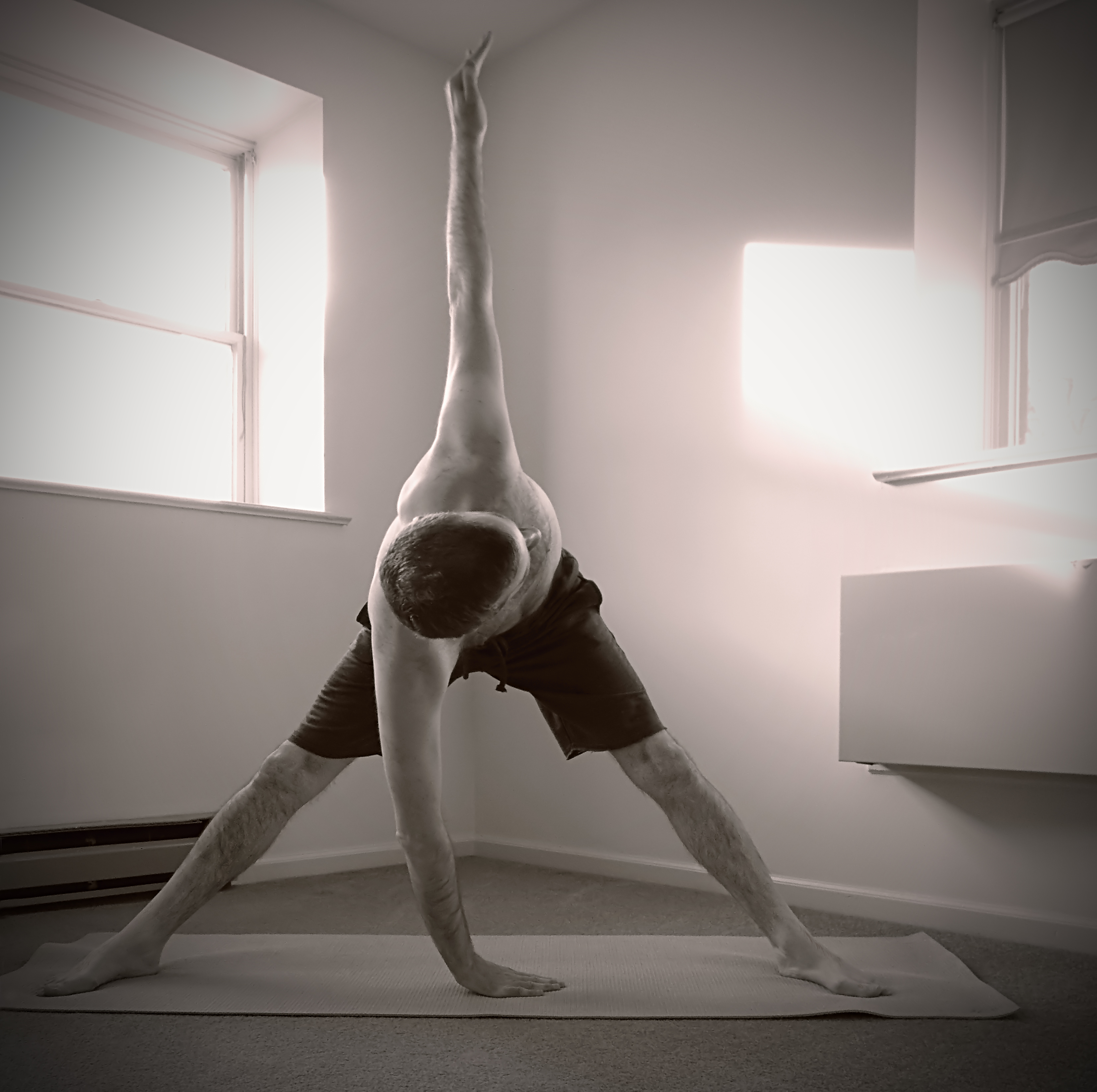
Windmill pose, close to position five of Satyananda Yoga's sequence version of Trikonasana

Different schools of yoga have varying views about what Trikonasana is. A 2001 article on the asana in Yoga Journal with instructions given by teachers from five modern yoga traditions (Iyengar Yoga, Ashtanga Vinyasa Yoga, Kripalu Yoga, Sivananda Yoga and Bikram Yoga) showed differing body positions. This article does not make a distinction between Trikonasana (triangle pose) and Utthita Trikonasana (extended triangle pose).

In the tradition of Satyananda Yoga, Trikonasana is described as a series of five asanas performed in sequence. The first three have the front knee bent, starting with the upper arm pointing straight up, the lower on the floor in front of the leg or with the elbow resting on the knee. The second has the upper arm pointing forwards over the head. The third has the upper arm behind the back. The fourth has the legs straight, both feet pointing slightly out, and the body held horizontally with the arms out to the sides. Finally, the right hand is touched to the left foot, with the left hand pointing straight up, the palm facing forwards, and the gaze directed up to the hand; then this is repeated on the other side.

== Variations ==
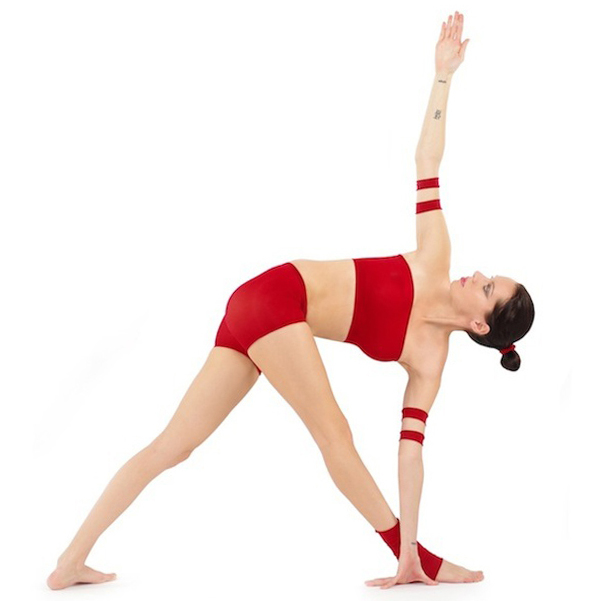
Parivritta Trikonasana

Trikonasana has one common variation, Parivritta Trikonasana (revolved triangle pose). Where in Utthita Trikonasana (with the left foot forward) the left hand reaches down towards the left foot, in the revolved pose it is the right hand that reaches to the left foot, and the trunk is rotated strongly to make this possible.

Other variations include the advanced Baddha Trikonasana (bound triangle pose). The legs and body are arranged much as for Utthita Trikonasana, but (with the left foot forward) the left arm reaches in front of the left thigh to catch the right arm which reaches behind the back. The right foot may be turned outwards more than usual to facilitate the additional upwards rotation of the torso.

Another advanced variation is Baddha Parivritta Trikonasana (bound revolved triangle pose). This resembles Parivritta Trikonasana but is bound with the hands joined, in the same way that Baddha Trikonasana is for unrotated (Utthita) Trikonasana.

Supta (Utthita) Trikonasana (reclining triangle pose) has the body, legs, and arms arranged exactly as for standing (Utthita) Trikonasana, but lying on the floor. It is convenient to have the feet pressing on a wall, with the yoga mat parallel to the wall and a little distance from it.

Supta Parivritta Trikonasana (reclining revolved triangle pose) is similarly Parivritta Trikonasana practised lying on the floor, with the feet pressing on a wall.

== In culture ==
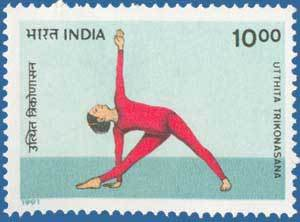
1991 ten-rupee Indian postage stamp marked "Utthita trikonasana"

The photograph of the pose performed by the British yoga teacher Mira Mehta in the 1990 guide Yoga the Iyengar Way was adapted for a 1991 ten-rupee Indian postage stamp. The image was described as a "perfect posture".

== See also ==
- List of asanas

== Sources ==
- Iyengar, B. K. S. (1979) [1966]. Light on Yoga: Yoga Dipika. Unwin Paperbacks. ISBN 978-1855381667.
- Mallinson, James; Singleton, Mark (2017). Roots of Yoga. Penguin Books. ISBN 978-0-241-25304-5. OCLC 928480104.
- Mehta, Silva; Mehta, Mira; Mehta, Shyam (1990). Yoga the Iyengar Way: The new definitive guide to the most practised form of yoga. Dorling Kindersley. ISBN 978-0863184208.
