= Hugger Mugger Yoga Products =

American manufacturer of yoga products

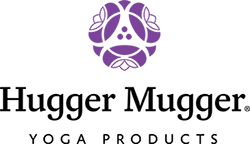
- Also called: Hugger Mugger Company, Inc.
- Type: Privately held
- Industry: Yoga, Meditation, Wellness, Fitness
- Founded: 1986
- Founder: Sara Chambers
- Headquarters: Salt Lake City, UT, USA
- Area served: Worldwide
- Products: Yoga mats, bolsters, props, accessories, meditation cushions, clothing
- Website: www.huggermugger.com

Hugger Mugger Yoga Products is a designer and manufacturer of products for yoga as exercise, based in Salt Lake City, Utah and founded in 1986. It developed the Tapas yoga mat, the first nonskid mat designed specifically for yoga.

== History ==
In 1986, Sara Chambers founded Hugger Mugger Yoga Products in Salt Lake City, Utah. Chambers was a custom furniture builder and a student of the Iyengar Yoga teachers Cita Mason and David Riley in that city.

During a workshop with the late Mary Dunn, Chambers observed the teacher using a belt to demonstrate a modification to a pose. This inspired her to create a 1-1/2-inch-wide cotton D-ring strap, and she began making more Iyengar-inspired yoga props in the basement of her home. She consulted with her local teachers and Dunn to help her come up with products, including handmade yoga bricks to B. K. S. Iyengar's specifications.

She named her company Hugger Mugger after the thigh-hugging yoga shorts she was sewing. (Hugger Mugger means "to conceal.") These maroon, velour shorts stayed in place during inversions and wide-legged poses with the addition of an elastic band around the thighs.

Chambers began importing and selling a makeshift yoga mat, cut from European carpet underlay. When she heard that this material would crumble after a few months, she decided to develop the Tapas yoga mat, the first mat designed specifically for yoga.

Hugger Mugger moved into a warehouse space in 1989, as the company began to outgrow her basement. To help continue expanding the business, Chambers took on a partner, David Chamberlain, in 1997. They have both since retired.
