= Core Strength Vinyasa Yoga =

School of modern yoga

- Founder: Sadie Nardini
- Established: 2006

Practice emphases
- Breath, strength, anatomy

Related schools
- Sivananda Yoga, Kundalini Yoga, Ashtanga (vinyasa) yoga, Anusara Yoga, Iyengar Yoga, Hatha Yoga

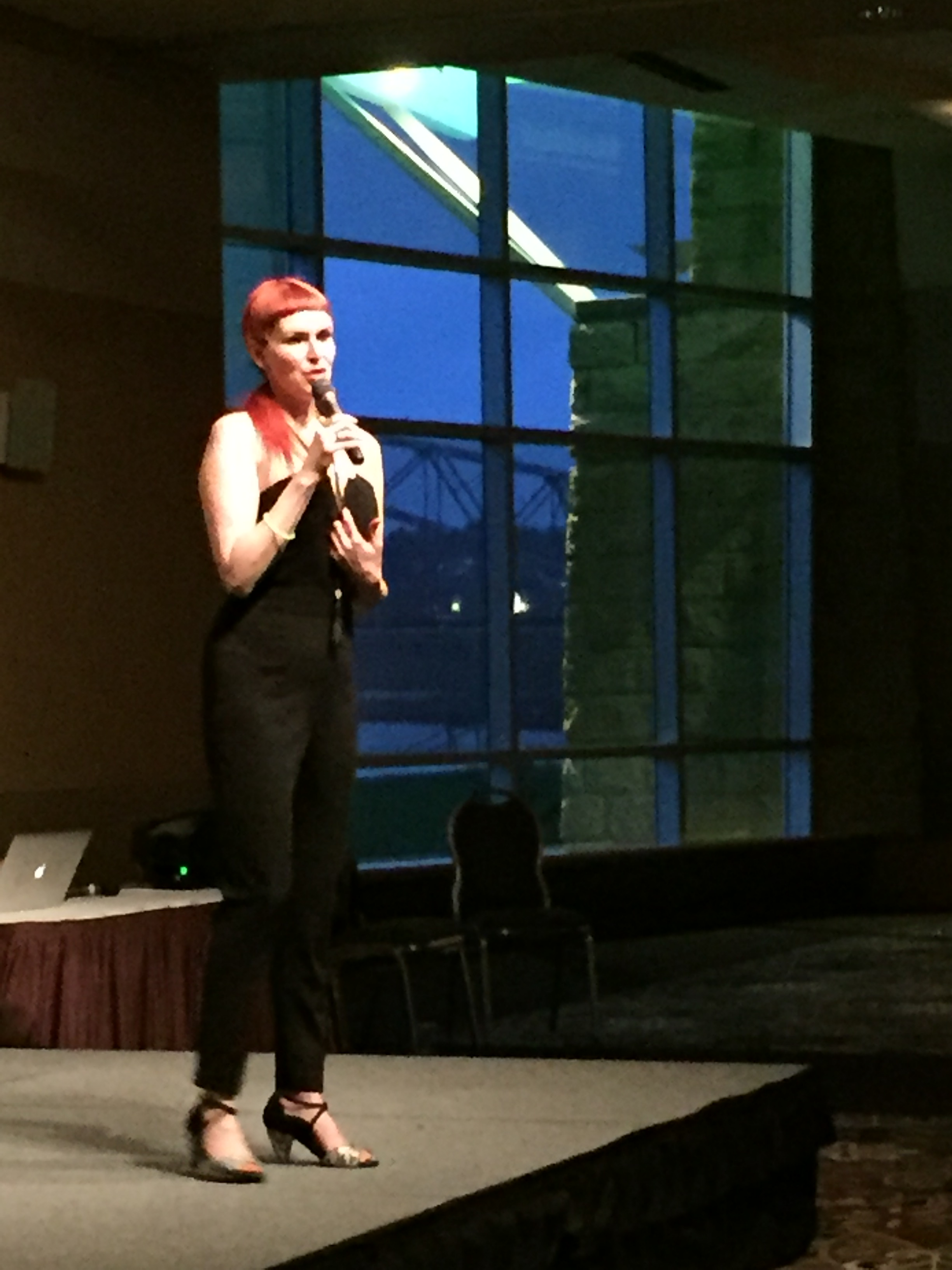
Sadie Nardini performing in Dubuque, Iowa

Core Strength Vinyasa Yoga is a style of yoga as exercise created by American yogini Sadie Nardini in 2006. Central to this style is a movement referred to as a 'wave' (softening). The structure of this practice includes a 7-step framework which is applied to each pose within a sequence. Nardini incorporates aspects of Kundalini Yoga, Sivananda Yoga, Anusara Yoga, Iyengar Yoga, and portions of movement sequences from Ashtanga (vinyasa) yoga. Maintaining an internal focus on joy in the moment is part of the practice philosophy. This style integrates postures with learnings from many disciplines including physics, biology, and geometry, influenced by the works of Leslie Kaminoff. It incorporates traditional yoga philosophy from the Yoga Sutras of Patanjali. It emphasizes muscles that are deep within the body and includes the use of 'waves' in order to enter and exit poses. Examples include physical moves that activate muscles close to the spine—such as psoas and quadratus lumborum in order to build support for the body from within before generating outward expression of that movement. The purpose of deep core focused poses in this practice is to improve and deepen breathing. This perspective differs from other styles in which the purpose of deep core work is to stabilize the back. In this practice, keeping belly soft and core strong improve breathing. "Belly Bonfire" breath is one example of a deep core breath technique that involves focus and target of attention and breath with softer abs. Pelvis is viewed as the body's physical center of gravity in this system.

== Key movements and foundations ==
Establishing the pose from the ground up is fundamental to this style of practice. A series of steps is applied to all poses and to the transitions between poses. A wave-like movement with relaxed musculature is integral to entering almost all poses. By softening the external body, deep internal muscles can be activated more easily. Each pose is begun from its base. For example, the feet are the first part of a standing pose to be established.

The practice uses precise cues unique to the style. These are 7 steps, cued and practiced in this specific order:

1. 'Neutralize' Relax the outer body's musculature. This is also known as softening the outer body. Since this takes place as the first part of a pose, it creates less gripping and resistance for the following steps. It is used a way to begin to reduce both physical and emotional tension.
2. 'Grounding Wave' Establish a firm connection to the ground by pressing down with feet and bending knees specifically in standing poses. Within this move, the firm base is established. In this way, the muscles connect to parts of the body that are on the floor and allow for a solid base in the pose. That solid base contributes to balance in standing poses.
3. 'Y Wave' Use ground connection to gain upward force through body through placing more weight into lower body and legs. From this move, physical force helps to lift the body. Strength and balance are both emphasized in this step.
4. 'Psoas Wave' Lift front of sacrum and lumbar spine gently in and up to lengthen without compressing front or back body. Within this type of wave and lift, the tendency to compress lower back is reduced. These are the deep core muscles that are closest to the spine and the muscles that are essential for elevation within standing poses.
5. 'Lumbar Wave' Draw back of sacrum and lumbar spine in and up. It is the opposite of and a complement to the psoas wave. This move recruits backside deep core muscles. This move lengthens the low back further.
6. 'Axial Wave' Extend limbs from the torso with ease and softness. This move aids in defining each pose's unique characteristics. These are the extensions of each pose.
7. 'Refine' Add final adjustments to pose. This move assists in differentiating the pose specific to each user's body shape. Some of these might include increasing the complexity of the pose or holding the pose for a longer period of time.

== Publications ==
- Nardini, Sadie, Road Trip Guide to the Soul: A 9 Step Guide to Reaching Your Inner Self and Revolutionizing Your Life, John Wiley and Sons Inc; 2008 ISBN 978-0-470-18774-6
- Nardini, Sadie, The 21 Day Yoga Body: A Metabolic Makeover and Life Styling Manual to Get You Fit, Fierce, and Fabulous in Just Three Weeks, Penguin Random House: 2013 ISBN 978-038-534706-8
- Klein, Melanie C., Yoga Rising: 30 Empowering Stories from Yoga Renegades for Every Body, Llewellyn Publications: 2018 ISBN 978-073-875082-8
