= Glossary of ballet =

Glossary of ballet terminology

Because ballet became formalized in France, a significant part of ballet terminology is in the French language.

== A ==
=== À la quatrième ===
(French pronunciation: [a la katʁijɛm]) One of the directions of body, facing the audience (en face), arms in second position, with one leg extended either to fourth position in front (quatrième devant) or fourth position behind (quatrième derrière).

=== À la seconde ===
(French pronunciation: [a la səɡɔ̃d]) (Literally "to second") If a step is done "à la seconde", it is done to the side. 'Second position'. It can also be a balance extending one foot off the ground in ‘Second Position’.

=== À terre ===
(French pronunciation: [a tɛʁ]) Touching the floor; on the floor.

=== Adagio ===
Italian, or French adage, meaning 'slowly, at ease.'

1. Slow movements performed with fluidity and grace.
2. One of the typical exercises of a traditional ballet class, done both at barre and in center, featuring slow, controlled movements.
3. The section of a grand pas (e.g., grand pas de deux), often referred to as grand adage, that features dance partnering.

=== Allegro ===
(Italian pronunciation: [alˈleːɡro]; meaning 'happy')

1. Brisk, lively motion. An attribute of many movements, including those in which a dancer is airborne (e.g., assemblé, changement, entrechat, sauté, sissonne, soubresaut).
2. Used in ballet to refer to all jumps, regardless of tempo.
3. A category of exercises found in a traditional ballet class, e.g. petit allegro (small, generally fast jumps) and grand allegro (large, generally slower jumps).

=== Allongé ===
(French pronunciation: [alɔ̃ʒe]; meaning 'elongated.') Refers to a foot and leg position when the toes and knees are extended and elongated, rather than forming the usual soft curve. Can also refer to a similar arm position.

=== Aplomb ===
The apparent elegance and precision exhibited by a confident, accomplished dancer.

=== Arabesque ===
In dance (particularly ballet), arabesque (French: [aʁabɛsk]; literally, "in Arabic fashion") is a body position in which a dancer stands on one leg (the supporting leg) with the other leg (the working leg) extended, straight, behind the body. The arm positions can vary and are generally allongé. The foot of the supporting leg may be flat on the floor, on the ball of the foot (demi-pointe/relevé), or on the tips of the toes (en pointe).

=== Arrière, en ===
(French pronunciation: [ɑ̃n aʁjɛːʁ]; meaning 'backwards') A movement towards the back, as opposed to en avant.

=== Arrondi ===
(French pronunciation: [aʁɔ̃di]; meaning 'rounded') A position of the hand. Rounded, in contrast with allongé ('stretched out', as in arabesque).

=== Assemblé ===
Assemblé

(French pronunciation: [asɑ̃ble]; literally 'assembled') Sometimes also pas assemblé. A jump that takes off from one foot and lands on two feet. When initiated with two feet on the ground (e.g. from fifth position) the working leg performs a battement glissé/dégagé, brushing out. The dancer launches into a jump, with the second foot then meeting the first foot before landing. A petit assemblé is when a dancer is standing on one foot with the other extended. The dancer then does a small jump to meet the first foot.

=== Attitude ===
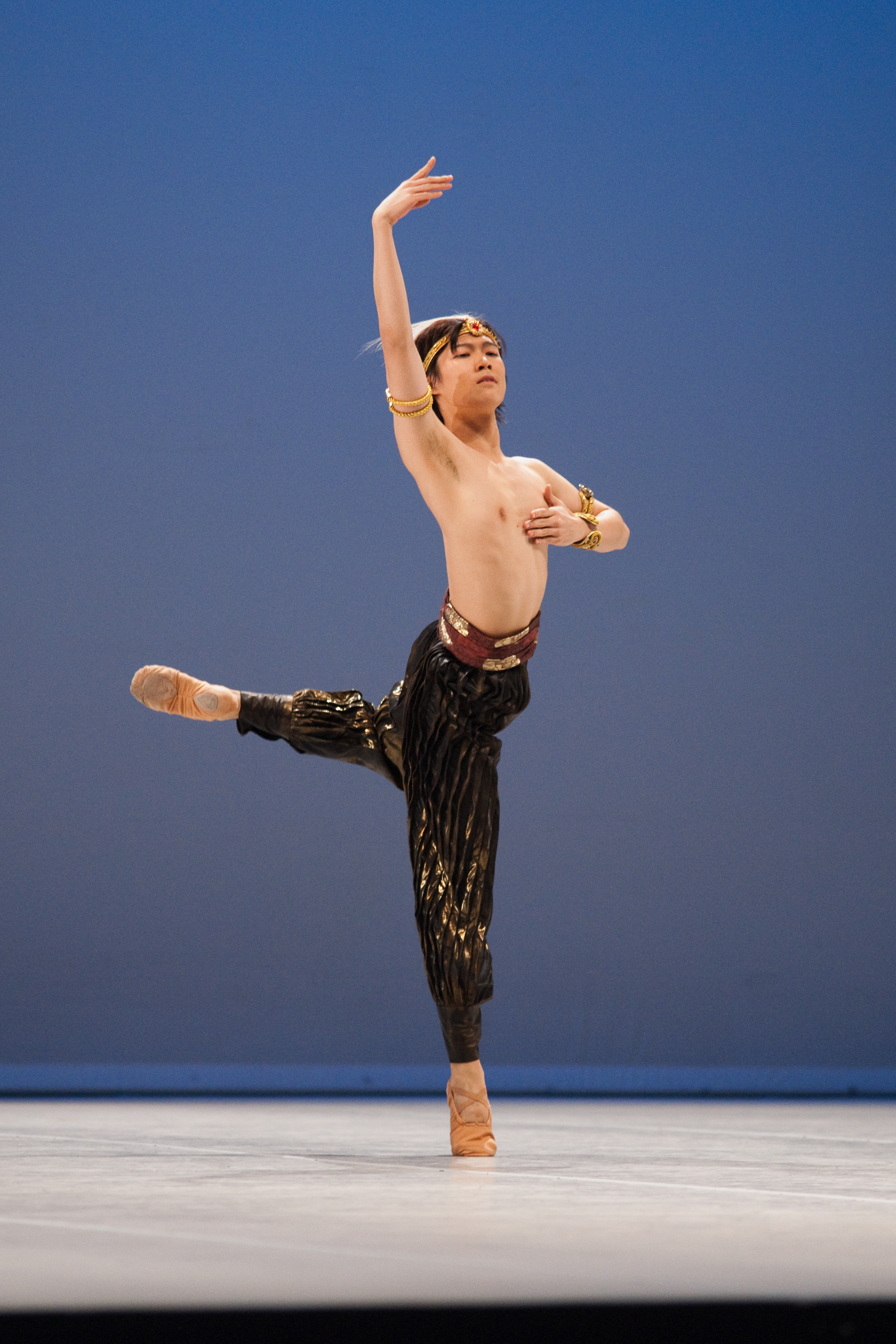
Attitude derrière

(French pronunciation: [atityd]) A position in which a dancer stands on one leg (the supporting leg) while the other leg (working leg) is raised and turned out with knee bent to form an angle of approximately 90° between the thigh and the lower leg. The height of the knee versus the foot and the angle of the knee flexion will vary depending on the techniques. The working leg can be held behind (derrière), in front (devant), or to the side (à la seconde) of the body. The alignment of the thigh compared to the midline in Attitude derrière will vary depending on the techniques. The foot of the supporting leg may be flat on the floor, en demi-pointe (ball of the foot), or en pointe (tips of the toes). The standing leg can be straight or bent ("fondu").

=== Avant, en ===
(French pronunciation: [ɑ̃n avɑ̃]; meaning 'forwards') A movement towards the front, as opposed to en arrière, which is conversely a movement towards the back. For example, a step travelling en avant moves forwards towards the audience, as in sissonne en avant.

== B ==
=== Balancé ===
Balancé

(French pronunciation: [balɑ̃se]; "to swing or rock") A rocking sequence of three steps—fondu, relevé, fondu (down, up, down)—executed in three counts. Before the first count, one foot extends in a dégagé to second position (balancé de côté) or to the front (balancé en avant) or rear (balancé en arrière). The second foot in the sequence (in any direction) assembles behind the first to relevé in fifth or fourth position.

=== Balançoire ===
(French pronunciation: [balɑ̃swaʁ]; "swing [children's toy]") Swinging the working leg between front (devant) and back (derrière) through first position, usually in conjunction with grands battements or attitudes and involving seesaw like shifting of the upper body in opposition to the legs. Similar to en cloche.

=== Ballerina ===
(Italian) A principal female ballet dancer in a ballet company. Ballerinas get more lead roles, which are referred to as principal roles as they are generally danced by principal dancers. Soloists also often dance in principal roles, but most of the time not in the first cast of the show (i.e. the cast that performs the most shows)

=== Ballerino ===
An informal term for male dancers in a ballet company in Italy.

=== Ballet ===
French word meaning a ballet performance, a ballet work, a ballet company and possibly the ballet dance genre, although the expression danse classique also exists for the latter meaning, is less equivocal and is more commonly used when referring to the learning of this dance.

=== Ballet technique ===
The foundational principles of body movement and form used in ballet.

=== Balletomane ===
A ballet fan or enthusiast. The word is of Russian origin c. 1930, with the suffix -mane coming from maniya (mania).

=== Ballon ===
Showing lightness of movement in leaps and jumps. A dancer exhibiting ballon will appear to spring effortlessly, float in mid-air, and land softly like a balloon.

=== Ballonné ===
In classical ballet, the term ballonné is a step where the leg is extended (can be front, side, or back) at 45 degrees. The knee is then bent and the foot brought to a sur le cou-de-pied position. This can also be done as a relevé or jump.

=== Ballotté ===
A ballotté ("tossed") is a jumping step in classical ballet that consists of coupé dessous and small developpés performed with a rocking and swinging movement. The step can be performed with the leg extensions at 45 or 90 degrees.

=== Barre ===
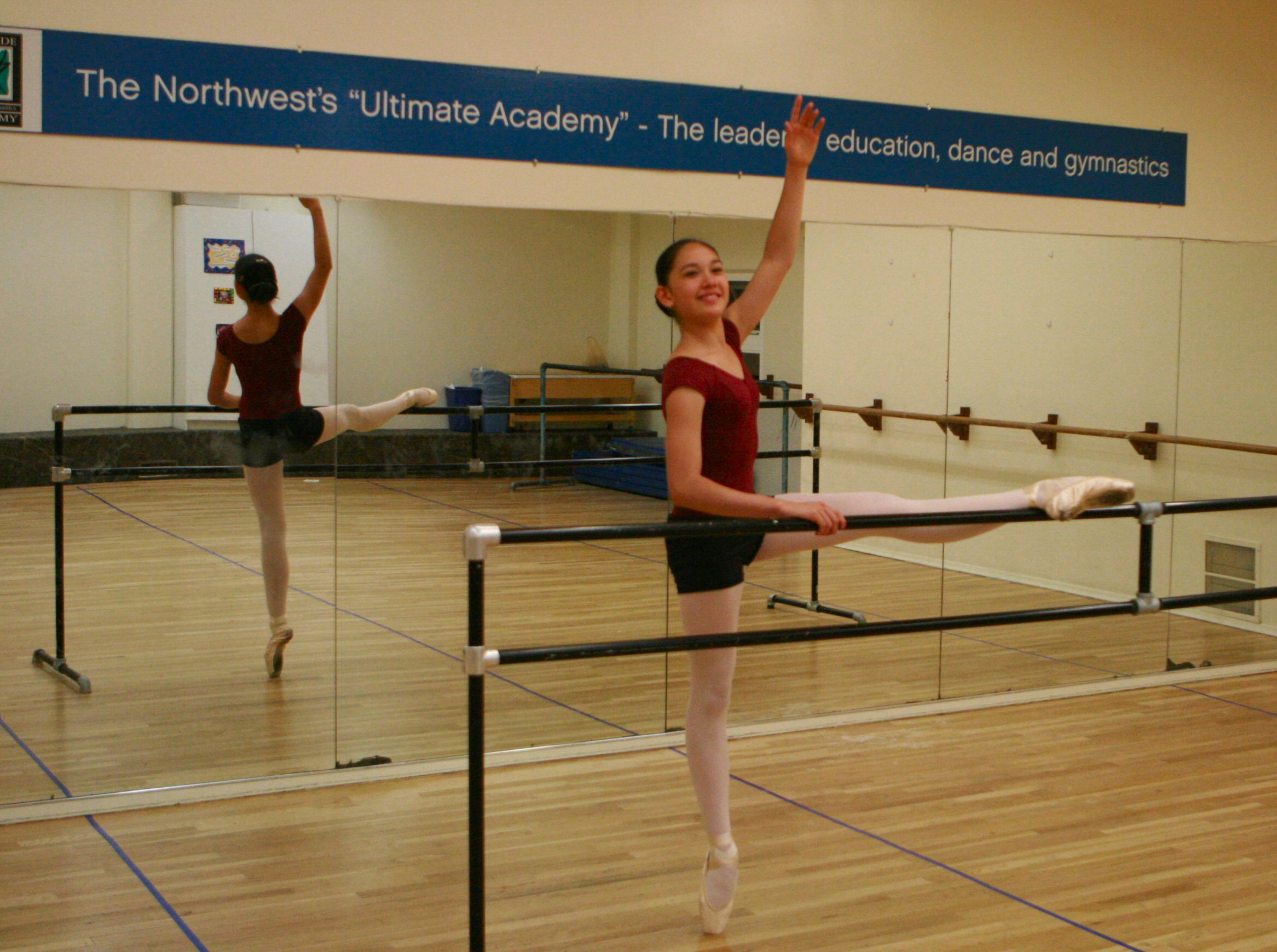
Exercising at a portable barre. A fixed barre can be seen in the background.

A sturdy horizontal bar, approximately waist height, used during ballet warm-up exercises and training. Fixed barres are typically mounted on -covered walls; portable barres can be relocated as needed. Used for balance, not support. A barre is a tool, not a necessary item to dance.

=== Battement ===
An alternating side-to-side movement of the working (non-supporting) leg. Typically performed in multiples, quickly and in rapid succession so that the working foot appears to be fluttering or vibrating.

=== Batterie ===
(French pronunciation: [batʁi]) A general term for jumps in which the legs open slightly sideways and close (crossed in fifth position) multiple times, alternating feet. (See "Battu.)

=== Battu ===
(French pronunciation: [baty]; meaning 'beaten') A movement with an extra beating of the feet included, as in jeté battu.

=== Bourrée ===
Quick movement of the feet, can be performed on pointe or on demi-pointe. The dancer straightens one leg (the leg in back) and bends a leg and picks it up(the leg in front). Then the bent leg is straighted on the floor and the straight leg is picked off the floor and bent. These steps are repeated over and over again. The dancer looks as if he or she is flying across the floor.

=== Brisé ===
(French pronunciation: [bʁize]; literally 'broken') A jump consisting of an assemblé traveling either forward (en avant) or backward (en arrière), with an extra beat that "breaks" the jump in its travel. To execute a brisé en avant, the dancer demi-pliés in fifth position and brushes the back leg (through first position) to the front, then springs into the air and brings the second foot to meet it in the back before switching to the front to land, creating a beating action with the legs. In a brisé en arrière, the process is reversed, with the front leg brushing to the back and beating to land in front.

=== Bras croisé ===
(French pronunciation: [bʁa kʁwaze]; literally 'crossed arms') Arm placement in which one arm is extended in second position away from the audience while the other is curved in first position (Cecchetti fourth position en avant or RAD/French third position).

=== Bravura ===
(Italian pronunciation: [braˈvuːra]) A flashy, showy and elaborate style of dance that involves a lot of elaborate steps and style to similar music. Usually during a key solo.

== C ==
=== Cabriole ===
Double cabriole derrière.

(French pronunciation: [kabʁijɔl]; meaning 'caper.') An allegro step in which the extended legs are beaten in the air. Cabrioles are divided into two categories: petite, which are executed at 45 degrees, and grande, which are executed at 90 degrees. The working leg is thrust into the air, the underneath leg follows and beats against the first leg, sending it higher. The landing is then made on the underneath leg. Cabriole may be done devant, derrière and à la seconde in any given position of the body such as croisé, effacé, écarté, and so on.

=== Cambré ===
(French pronunciation: [kɑ̃bʁe]; literally 'arched.') A bending at the waist in any direction, forward, backward, or to the side.

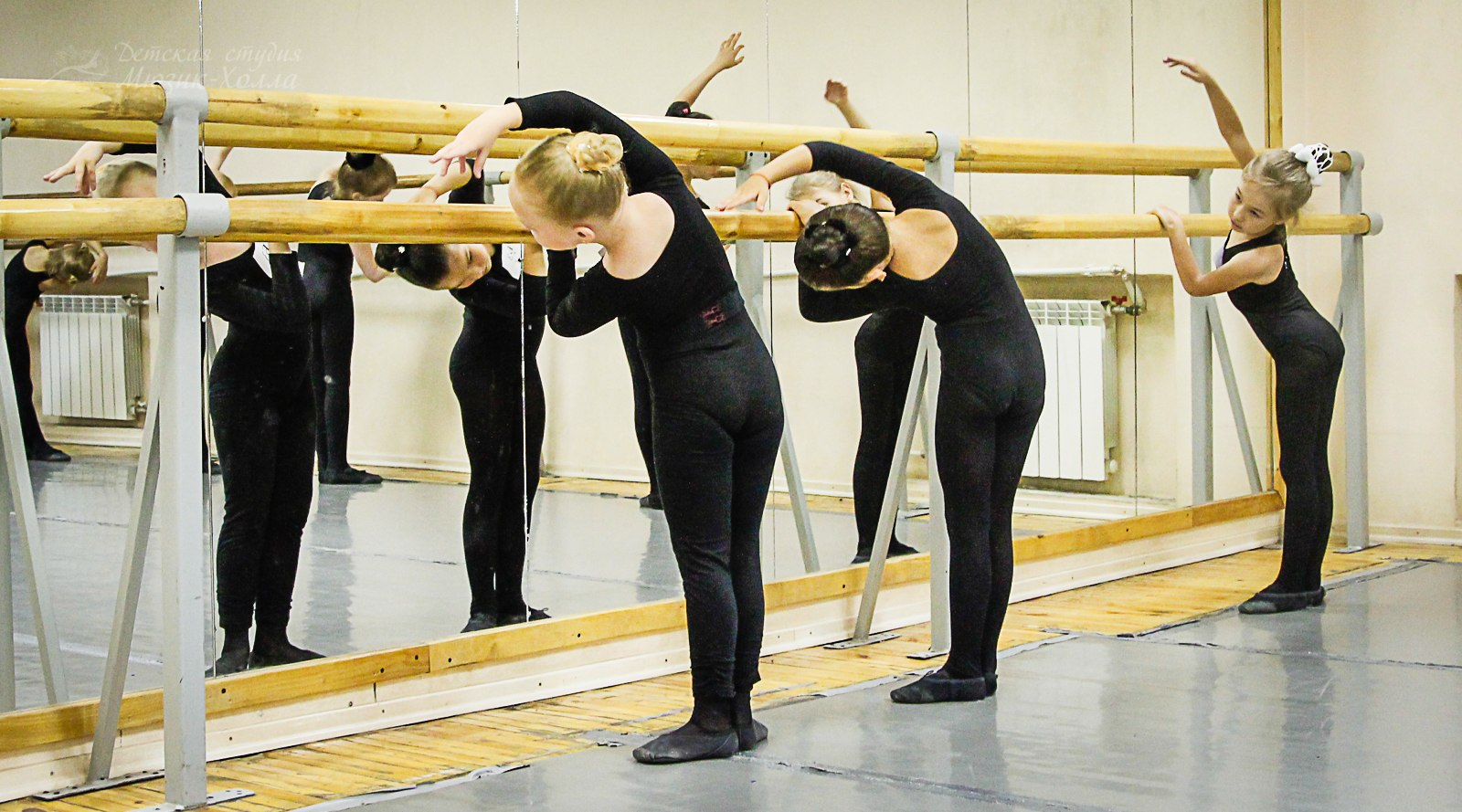
Group of ballet students performing Cambre

=== Chaînés ===
(French pronunciation: [ʃɛne]; 'chained', plural.) Also known as "chaînés turns", a common abbreviation for tours chaînés déboulés, a series of quick, 360 degree turns that alternate the feet while traveling along a straight line or in a circular path. Each foot performs a half turn, with feet held in a tight first position en pointe or demi-pointe.

=== Changement de pied ===
(French pronunciation: [ʃɑ̃ʒmɑ̃]; literally 'change, changing.') A jump in which the feet change positions in the air. For example, beginning in fifth position with the right foot front, plié, jump switching the right leg to the back, and land in fifth position with the left foot front. In the Vaganova vocabulary, petit changement de pieds indicates a changement where the feet barely leave the floor.

=== Chassé ===
Chassé

(Literally 'chased.')

1. A sliding movement forward, backward, or sideways with both legs bent, then springing into the air with legs straight and together. It can be done either in a gallop or by pushing the leading foot along the floor in a plié to cause an upward spring. It is typically performed in a series or as part of a combination of other movements.
2. A sliding movement as described above, but without the jump aspect. Instead, the leading foot is pushed along the floor in plié as described above, as a transition into another movement or position.

=== Cloche, en ===
(French pronunciation: [ɑ̃ klɔʃ]; meaning 'like a bell.') Refers to brushing through first position from fourth devant or fourth derrière to the opposite fourth with the upper body held upright. Can be done continuously, as is often done with grands battements and attitudes. Similar to Balançoire, which additionally allows seesaw like upper-body shifting in counterpoint to the legs.

The Vaganova system may refer to en cloche as "passé la jambe" or "battement passé la jambe".

=== Coda ===
(Italian pronunciation: [ˈkoːda]); literally 'tail'). The concluding segment of a performance or suite of dances comprising a grand pas (e.g., grand pas de deux). A particularly large or complex coda may be called a grand coda. If a large group of dancers participate, the terms coda générale or grand coda générale may be used.

=== Corps de ballet ===
The ensemble of a ballet company, especially the ensemble apart from the featured dancers. Being a part of the corps means one is neither a soloist nor a principal dancer.

=== Coryphée ===
(French pronunciation: [kɔʁife]) In some systems, a dancer of higher rank than a member of the corps de ballet, performing in small ensembles and small solo roles but not ranked as a soloist.

=== Côté, de ===
(French pronunciation: [də kote]; 'sideways.') A movement traveling to the side.

=== Cou-de-pied ===
(French pronunciation: [ku də pje]; 'neck of the foot.') Position of the arched working foot raised to, and resting on, the ankle. This could be in front (["conditional"] devant), behind (derrière), or wrapped (sur le cou-de-pied: arch of the foot wrapped around the ankle with the heel in front of the ankle and the toes behind, often interchangeable with the devant/conditional position), depending on the activity and the school/method of ballet.

=== Coupé ===
(French pronunciation: [kupe]; meaning 'cut.') Coupé is both a step and action. It is commonly executed from cou-de-pied front to cou-de-pied back or vice versa. It may also be done from an extended leg position into fondu or directly through fifth position (as in concluding a jeté). Coupé can only be performed through a closed leg position.

The Vaganova School rarely uses the term coupé except as the preparation for specific allegros. Rather, "tombé through fifth position" is more commonly used.

In the United States, "coupé" may be used to denote the position cou-de-pied, not unlike "passé" is used to denote the position retiré in addition to the action of passing through retiré.

=== Couru ===
(French pronunciation: [kuʁy]; 'run,' past participle, as in 'making small quick steps.') In most cases, this holds the calves together and the feet in a tight fifth position en pointe or demi-pointe and travels forward, backward, or to either side. E.g. pas de bourrée couru (also called bourrée for short).

=== Croisé, croisée ===
(French pronunciation: [kʁwɑze]; meaning 'crossed.') One of the positions of the body or épaulement. Facing one of the corners of the stage, the body presents at an oblique angle to the audience, such that the audience can see still both shoulders and hips. The working leg may be crossed to the front (devant) or to the back (derrière).

Croisé is used in the third, fourth, and fifth positions of the legs. A dancer is in croisé devant if at a 45 angle to the audience, the downstage leg (closest to the audience) is working to the front and the arms are open in third or fourth with the downstage arm being the one in second. A dancer is in croisé derrière if at a 45 degree angle to the audience, the upstage leg (farthest from the audience) is working to the back and the arms are open in third, fourth, or allongé in arabesque with the upstage arm being the one out towards second, e.g. arabesque croisée or Russian fourth arabesque. Croisé derrière in the Russian school alternatively has the upstage leg working to the back, but the downstage arm out to second.

Examples of croisé: the front leg is the right leg and the dancer is facing the front-left corner of the stage; or the front leg is the left, and the dancer is facing his/her front-right corner.

=== Croix, en ===
(French pronunciation: [ɑ̃ kʁwɑ]; meaning 'in the shape of a cross.') Term often used during barre exercises to indicate that a step is done to the front, to the side, to the back, and then again to the side (as in the shape of a cross), finishing closed in either first or fifth position.

== D ==
=== Danseur ===
(French pronunciation: [dɑ̃sœʁ]) A male ballet dancer.

=== Danseur noble ===
(French pronunciation: [dɑ̃sœʁ nɔbl]) A male ballet dancer who excels in refined classical roles, often playing the prince or other royalty in a classical ballet.

=== Danseuse ===
(French pronunciation: [dɑ̃søz]) A female ballet dancer.

=== Déboulés ===
(French pronunciation: [debule]); literally 'hurtled,' as in 'with great speed.') Another name denoting the same move as a chaîné (i.e. les tours chaînés déboulés). Small, very quick half-turns performed by stepping onto one leg, and completing the turn by stepping onto the other, performed on the balls of the feet or high on the toes, with the legs held very close together.

=== Dedans, en ===
(French pronunciation: [ɑ̃ dədɑ̃]; 'inwards.') Inside movement.

1. Circular movement where a leg that starts at the back or the side moves towards the front. For the right leg, this is a counter-clockwise circle. For the left leg, this is a clockwise circle. For example, in a rond de jambe en dedans, starting from first position, the foot first extends to tendu back, then moves to tendu to the side, and then tendu front, and back in again to first position.
2. Turning motion in the direction of the supporting leg. In a pirouette en dedans, the dancer would turn to their right if their left leg was lifted, or vice versa. Opposite of en dehors.

=== Dégagé ===
(French pronunciation: [deɡaʒe]; 'disengaged.') Common abbreviation for battement dégagé, the foot of the working leg sharply brushes through the floor through tendu pointed in the air 45 degrees or lower. Dégagé is part of the (initiating) execution of jumps such as jeté, assemblé, brisé, and glissade.

Primarily a Cecchetti/RAD term, this is known as battement tendu jeté in the Russian School or battement glissé in the French School.

=== Dehors, en ===
(French pronunciation: [ɑ̃ dəɔʁ]; 'outwards.') Circular movement where a leg that starts at the front or the side moves towards the back. For a right working leg, this is a clockwise circle. For example, in a rond de jambe en dehors, starting from first position, the foot (either left or right) would first extend tendu front, move to tendu to the side, and then tendu back, and back in again to first position. In a pirouette en dehors, the body turns in the direction of the working leg (the leg raised in retiré passé). Opposite of en dedans.

=== Demi ===
(French pronunciation: [dəmi]; meaning 'half.') Applied to plié, pointe, and other movements or positions to indicate a smaller or lesser version.

=== Demi-détourné ===
(French pronunciation: [dəmi detuʁne]) A pivoted half turn executed on both feet. For example, if starting right foot front in fifth position, demi-plié and relevé onto demi-pointe while pivoting a half turn inwards/en dedans towards the direction of the back foot (here left). The feet will have now changed position with the left foot in front in fifth position.

=== Demi-pointe ===
(French pronunciation: [dəmi pwɛ̃t]) Supporting one's body weight on the balls of one or both feet, heels raised off the floor.

=== Derrière ===
(French pronunciation: [dɛʁjɛːʁ]; literally 'behind.') At or to the back. For example, a battement tendu derrière is a battement tendu to the rear.

=== Dessous ===
(French pronunciation: [dəsu]; literally 'under.') Used to indicate that the front leg should be brought to close behind the other leg during a step. For example, assemblé, pas de bourrée, and glissade can be designated as under or dessous.

=== Dessus ===
(French pronunciation: [dəsy]; literally 'over.') Used to indicate that the back leg should be brought to close in front of the other leg during a step. For example, assemblé, pas de bourrée, and glissade can be designated as over or dessus.

=== Devant ===
(French pronunciation: [dəvɑ̃]; literally 'front.') Facing or moving to the front, as in tendu devant or attitude devant.

=== Développé ===
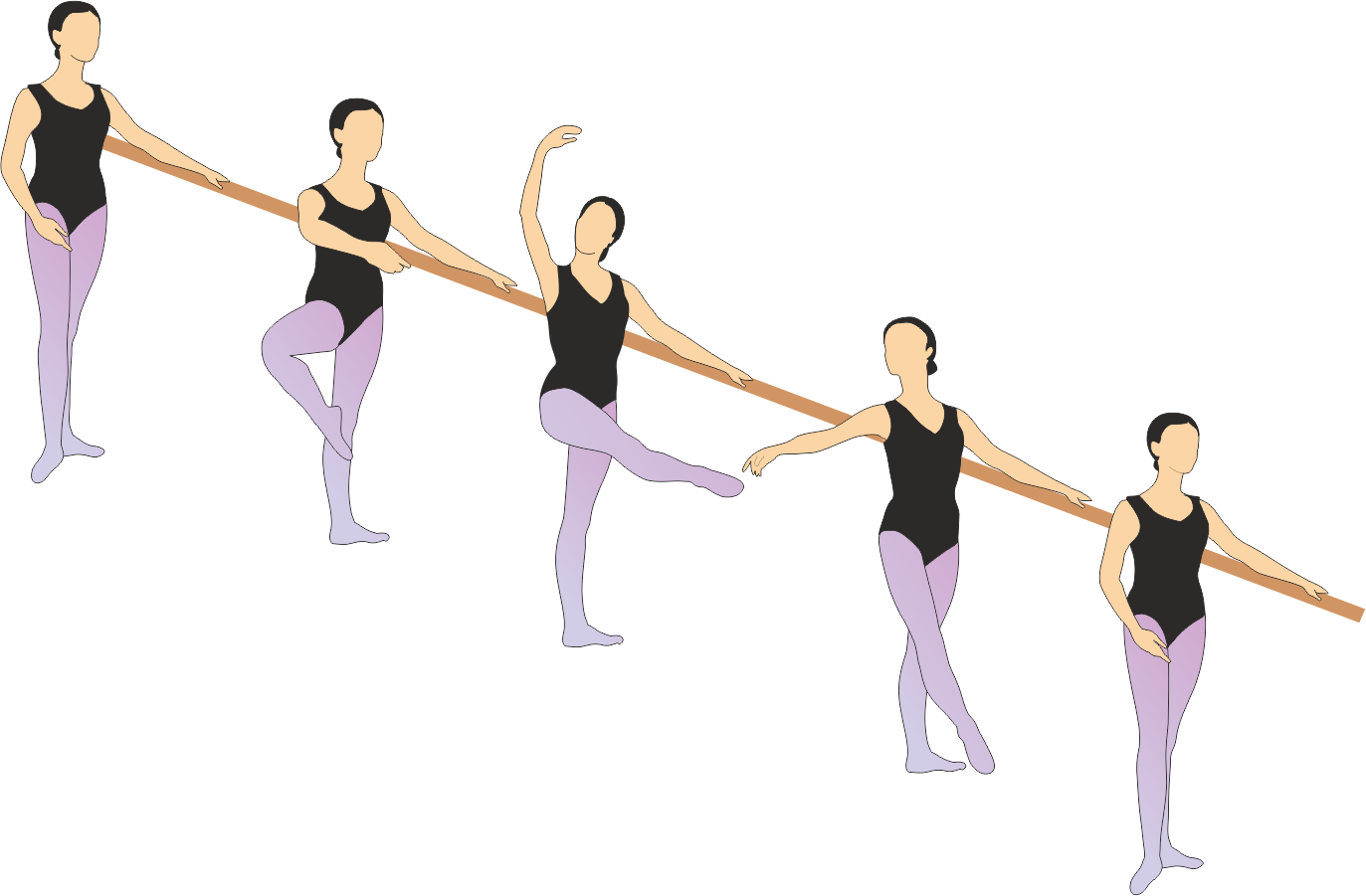
Développé

(French pronunciation: [devlɔpe]) Common abbreviation for temps développé. A movement in which the leg is lifted to cou-de-pied or retiré and then fully extended outward, passing through attitude. It can be done to the front (devant), to the side (à la seconde), or to the back (derrière).

=== Double ===
(French pronunciation: [dubl]; 'double.') Making two of a movement, such as in double rond de jambe en l'air.

== E ==
=== Écarté ===
(French pronunciation: [ekaʁte]; literally 'spread,' as in 'separated.') One of the basic positions of the body facing the audience at an oblique angle and with the downstage leg open to the side of the body, along the other diagonal, either touching the floor or en l'air. The arm on the same side as the working leg (i.e. the downstage arm) is raised en haut and the other arm is in second position. The gaze is directed to the raised arm along the same diagonal

In schools that recognize an écarté derrière, such as the French school, écarté devant is described above, and écarté derrière differs in having the working leg in second being on the same side as the corner the body is facing, i.e. the upstage leg is the working leg; the upstage arm is en haut, and the gaze is directed down the length of the arm in second.

=== Échappé ===
(French pronunciation: [eʃape]; literally 'escaped.') A movement done from a closed (first or fifth) position to an open (second or fourth) position. There are two kinds of échappés: échappé sauté and échappé sur les pointes or demi-pointes. In an échappé sauté, a dancer takes a deep plié followed by a jump in which the legs "escape" into either second (usually when initiating from first position) or fourth position (usually when initiating from fifth position) landing in demi-plié. In échappé sur le pointes/demi-pointes a dancer begins with a deep plié, springs onto les pointes or demi-pointes, ending in either second position (when starting from first position) or fourth (when starting from fifth) with knees straight. The dancer may or may not return to the initial position, depending on the choreography.

=== Élevé ===
(French pronunciation: [elve]; 'raised, lifted.') Rising to pointe or demi-pointe from straight legs and flat feet. This term is used in some schools in contrast with relevé (in effect, 'relifted'), which is taken to indicate a rise from plié (bent knees). In other schools (French, Russian, textbook Cecchetti), relevé covers both these concepts.

=== Emboîté ===
(French pronunciation: [ɑ̃bwate])

1. A small traveling step (en avant or en arrière) where each leg is alternately brought to cou-de-pied, passing the previous standing leg in doing so. Both legs shoot straight downward in the air, and land on one foot in cou-de-pied. This step is often done turning ("en tournant"), where each jump rotates 1/2 turn.
2. A traveling series of jumps where each leg is alternately brought to attitude devant in the air, each foot passing the previous one in alternating.
3. A series of small walks done on pointe or demi-pointe, traveling either forward (en avant) or backward (en arrière); the dancer stands in sous-sus and brushes one leg to the side, then closes it in the opposite position (front or back) of where it started, and repeats this motion several times in succession, alternating legs.
4. A variation on the typical tour piqué/piqué turn, where the dancer does 1/2 piqué turn as usual, then, without coming off relevé, steps onto the previously working leg and lifts the previously supporting leg to retiré to finish the turn. This can be done several times in succession. (See "Piqué turn.")

=== En ===
(French pronunciation: [ɑ̃]; meaning 'in.') A preposition used in description of a dancer's position (e.g., en plié, en relevé, en pointe) or holding the meaning 'towards' when describing direction of a movement (en avant, en arrière, en dedans, en dehors = 'to the front,' 'to the back', 'to the inside,' 'to the outside').

==== En arrière ====
See Arrière

==== En avant ====
See Avant

==== En cloche ====
See Cloche

==== En croix ====
See Croix

Front side back side ( in the shape of a cross )

==== En dedans ====
See Dedans

Movement of the leg in an inwards rotation direction

==== En dehors ====
See Dehors

==== En face ====
See Face

==== En pointe ====
See Pointe

=== Entrechat ===
(French pronunciation: [ɑ̃tʁəʃa]; from Italian intrecciata, 'intertwined.') "A step of beating in which the dancer jumps into the air and rapidly crosses the legs before and behind." In an entrechat quatre ('four'), starting from fifth position, right foot front, a dancer will jump up with legs crossed, execute a changement beating the right thigh at the back of the left thigh, then bring the right leg in front again beating the front of the left thigh, and land in the same position as started. In an entrechat six ('six'), three changes of the feet are made in the air, ultimately changing which foot is in front. Even-numbered entrechats indicate the number of times the legs cross in and out in the air: a regular changement is two (one out, one in), entrechat quatre is two outs, two ins; six is three and three; huit is four and four. Odd-numbered entrechats refer to the previous number, but done landing on one foot with the other in cou-de-pied: for example, an entrechat cinq (five) is the same as an entrechat-quatre, but done landing on one leg.

=== Entrée ===
(French pronunciation: [ɑ̃tʁe])

1. The initial part of a grand pas, which serves as an introduction for the suite of dances comprising the grand pas.
2. The initial appearance of a lead character or characters of a ballet on stage.

=== Entrée de ballet ===
An autonomous scene of ballet de cour, divertissement, comédie-ballet, opéra-ballet, even tragédie lyrique, which brings together several dancers in and out of the scenario.

=== Épaulé ===
(French pronunciation: [epole]; 'shouldered.') One of the positions of the body or épaulement where the body is at an oblique angle to the audience, the downstage arm is allongé in front and the downstage shoulder appears prominent to the audience as the downstage leg works to the back (e.g. second arabesque).

=== Épaulement ===
(French pronunciation: [epolmɑ̃]; 'shouldering.') Rotation of the shoulders and head relative to the hips in a pose or a step. This term relates only to the movement of the body from the waist up. The head generally looks over shoulder that is forward (downstage).

=== Étoile ===
The leading ballet dancer in a company.

== F ==
=== Face, en ===
(French pronunciation: [ɑ̃ fas]; 'facing, in front of.') En face indicates facing something directly, generally the audience.

=== Failli ===
(French pronunciation: [faji] 'given way', past participle.) A slide or brush-through transition step following a preceding jump or position. Failli is often used as shorthand for a sissonne (ouverte +pas) failli, indicating a jump from two feet landing on one (sissonne) with the back foot then sliding through to the front (chassé passé), and this is often done in conjunction with an assemblé: (sissonne) failli assemblé. E.g. From croisé, the upstage leg opens behind on the sissonne as the body changes direction in the air to land ouverte effacé; the back leg which is now downstage slides through in a chassé passé to fourth in front, ending the dancer croisé the corner opposite the original. This chassé passé is the (pas) failli. An assemblé (dessus/over) to the opposite corner would reorient the body back to its original position. Failli phrased with arabesque indicates the brushed follow-through of an arabesqued leg from elevated behind to fourth in front as lead-in to a following step.

=== First position (feet) ===
Turned out legs with the feet pointing in opposite directions, heels touching.

=== Fermé, fermée ===
(French pronunciation: [fɛʁme]; 'closed.') Converse of ouvert(e) ('open'). Fermé may refer to positions (the first, fifth, and third positions of the feet are positions fermées), limbs, directions, or certain exercises or steps. Example: a sissonne fermée ends with closed legs, as opposed to a sissonne ouverte, which lands on one leg with the other (generally) extended.

=== Fifth position ===
A posture in which the feet are turned outward. With one foot in the front and one in the back, you will make fifth position. The front foot is usually facing horizontal while the back foot is diagonal. It does not matter which foot is in the front or back, as long as they are turned out. You can do pirouettes, changements, frappés, plies, and much more with fifth position.

=== Fish dive ===
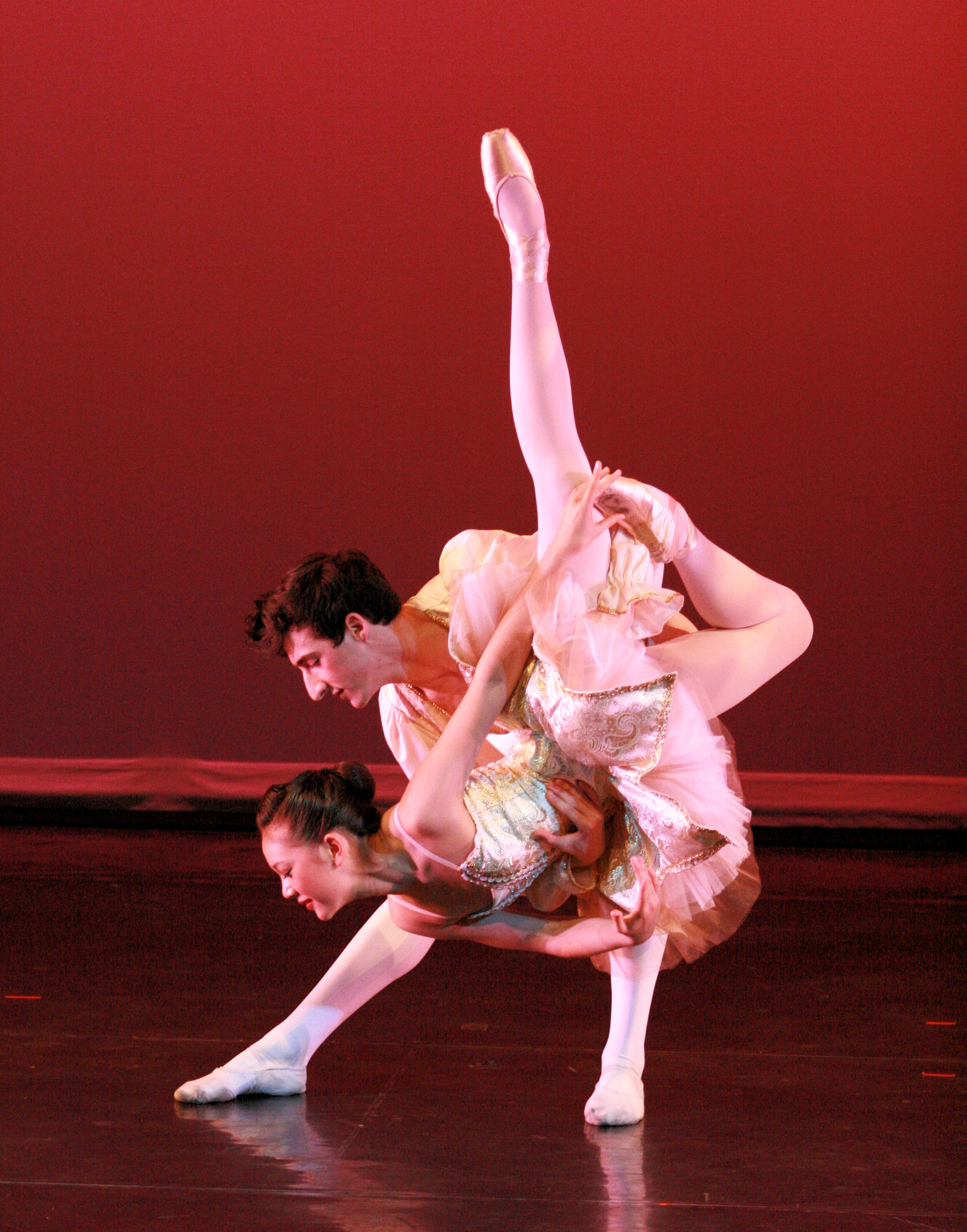
A fish dive lift

A partnering dance lift, often performed as part of a pas de deux, in which the male dancer supports the female in a poisson position.

=== Flic flac ===
(French pronunciation: [flik flak]) Familiar French term for battement fouetté à terre. A step where the foot of the working leg sweeps flexed across the floor from pointed à la seconde (en l'air, as in dégagé) to pointed at cou-de-pied devant or derrière.

=== Fondu ===
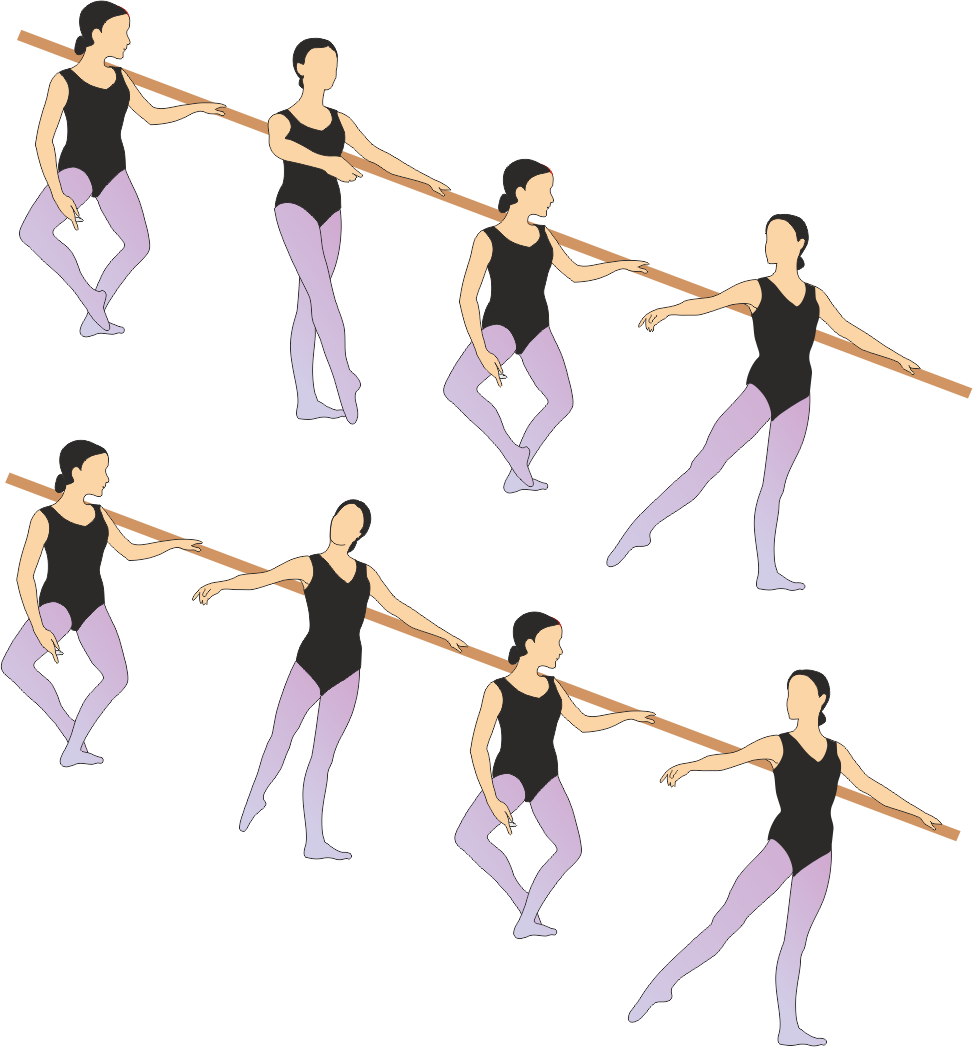
Fondu

(French pronunciation: [fɔ̃dy]; literally 'melted.')

1. Abbreviation for battement fondu, a lowering of the body made by bending the knee of the supporting leg, the working leg extending out à terre or in the air. Saint-Léon wrote, "Fondu is on one leg what a plié is on two." Fondu at the barre often refers to battement fondu développé, where the supporting leg begins fondu with the foot of the working leg at cou-de-pied; the working leg extends out through a petit développé as the supporting leg straightens.
2. A term used to modify any one-legged position in order to indicate a bent supporting leg (e.g. arabesque fondu).

=== Fouetté ===
Dancer performing Fouetté en tournant en dehors

(French pronunciation: [fwɛte]; literally 'whipped.') Fouetté itself refers to a move where a quick pivot on the supporting leg changes the orientation of the body and the working leg. E.g. A 180-degree or 90-degree fouetté could involve a working leg beginning extended elevated in front; the supporting leg rising onto demi-pointe or pointe quickly executing a "half" turn inside/en dedans, leading to the working leg ending in arabesque and the body now facing the opposite direction or stage direction. (This brand of action can be seen in both tour jetés and waltz turns (pas de valse en tournant).) A fouetté could also change the leg/body orientation from, for example, en face à la seconde to épaulé (second) arabesque/croisé first arabesque or effacé devant, if outside/en dehors, via a 45-degree turn.

Fouetté is also common shorthand for fouetté rond de jambe en tournant (pictured here en dehors). A fouetté turn is a turn that begins with the supporting leg in plié. As the supporting foot transitions to demi-pointe or pointe, in an en dehors turn, the working leg extends forward and then whips around to the side as the working foot is retracted to the supporting knee in retiré, creating the impetus to rotate one turn. The working leg returns out of retiré nearing the end of a single rotation to restart the entire leg motion for successive rotations.

=== Fouetté jeté ===
(French pronunciation: [fwɛte ʒəte]) A leap that begins with a fouetté.

=== Frappé ===
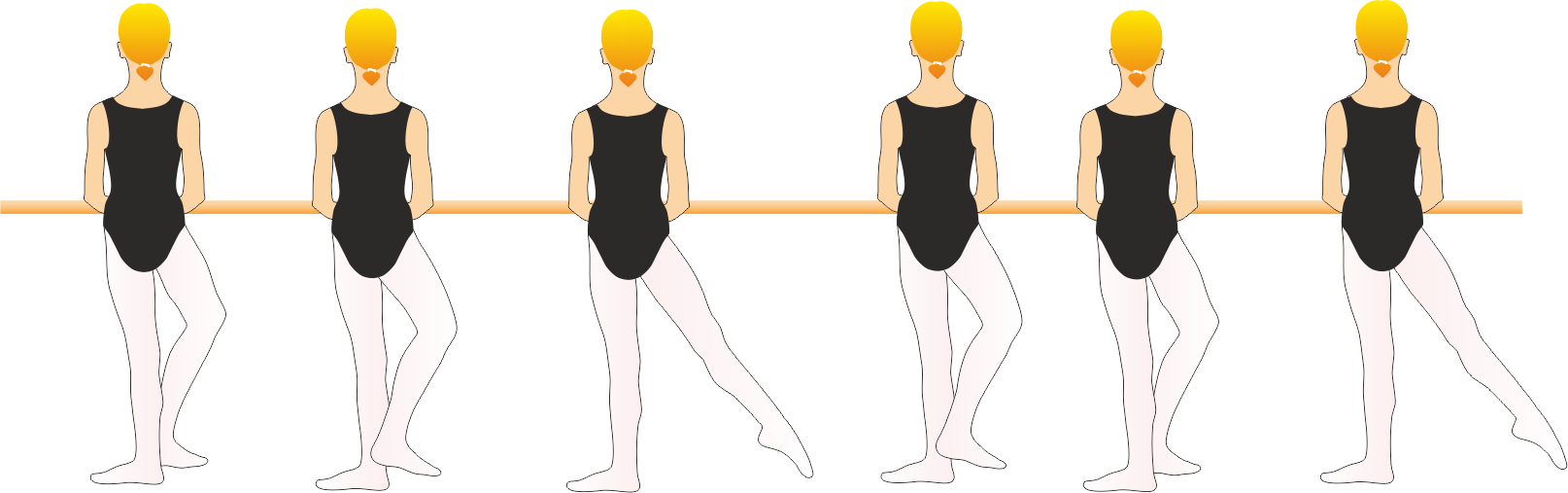
Frappé

(French pronunciation: [fʁape]; 'struck.') Abbreviation of battement frappé. Action of extending the working foot out from cou-de-pied. In Cecchetti, RAD, and American ballet, on flat, this action involves brushing a flexed (or non-pointed relaxed) foot from cou-de-pied through the floor, the ball of the foot (lightly) striking as extending out pointed through dégagé. In the Russian school, a pointed foot at cou-de-pied extends directly out to dégagé height without brushing through the floor. On demi-pointe, Cecchetti employs the Russian style of non-brushed pointed foot directly out. Other schools may use a flexed foot without the strike or a non-brushed pointed foot on demi-pointe.

Frappés are commonly done in singles, doubles, or triples. Double and triple frappés involve tapping the foot (flexed or pointed) at both cou-de-pied devant (or wrapped) and derrière before extending out. (E.g. Double frappé front would be cou-de-pied back, cou-de-pied front, dégagé front. Double frappé back would be front, back, [dégagé] back. Triple frappé front would be front, back, front, [dégagé] front.)

== G ==
=== Gargouillade ===
A complicated jump involving a pas de chat with a double rond de jambe.

=== Glissade ===
(French pronunciation: [ɡlisad]; literally 'glide.') A traveling step starting in fifth position from demi-plié. The leading foot brushes out to dégagé as weight bears on the trailing leg, weight is shifted to the leading leg via a jump and the trailing foot extends out of plié into degagé. The leading foot lands tombé and the trailing foot slides in to meet the leading foot in fifth position demi-plié. A glissade can be done en avant, en arrière, dessous (leading front foot ends back), dessus (leading back foot ends front), or without a changement of feet.

=== Glissade précipitée ===
(French pronunciation: [ɡlisad pʁesipite]; "precipitated glide".) A quick glissade generally done leading into a following step, such as with glissade jeté or glissade assemblé.

=== Grand écart ===
(French pronunciation: [ɡʁɑ̃t ekaʁ]; literally "big gap".) Opening the legs to 180°, front or sideways. Known as 'spagat' in German or 'the splits' or 'jump splits' in English.

=== Grand jeté ===
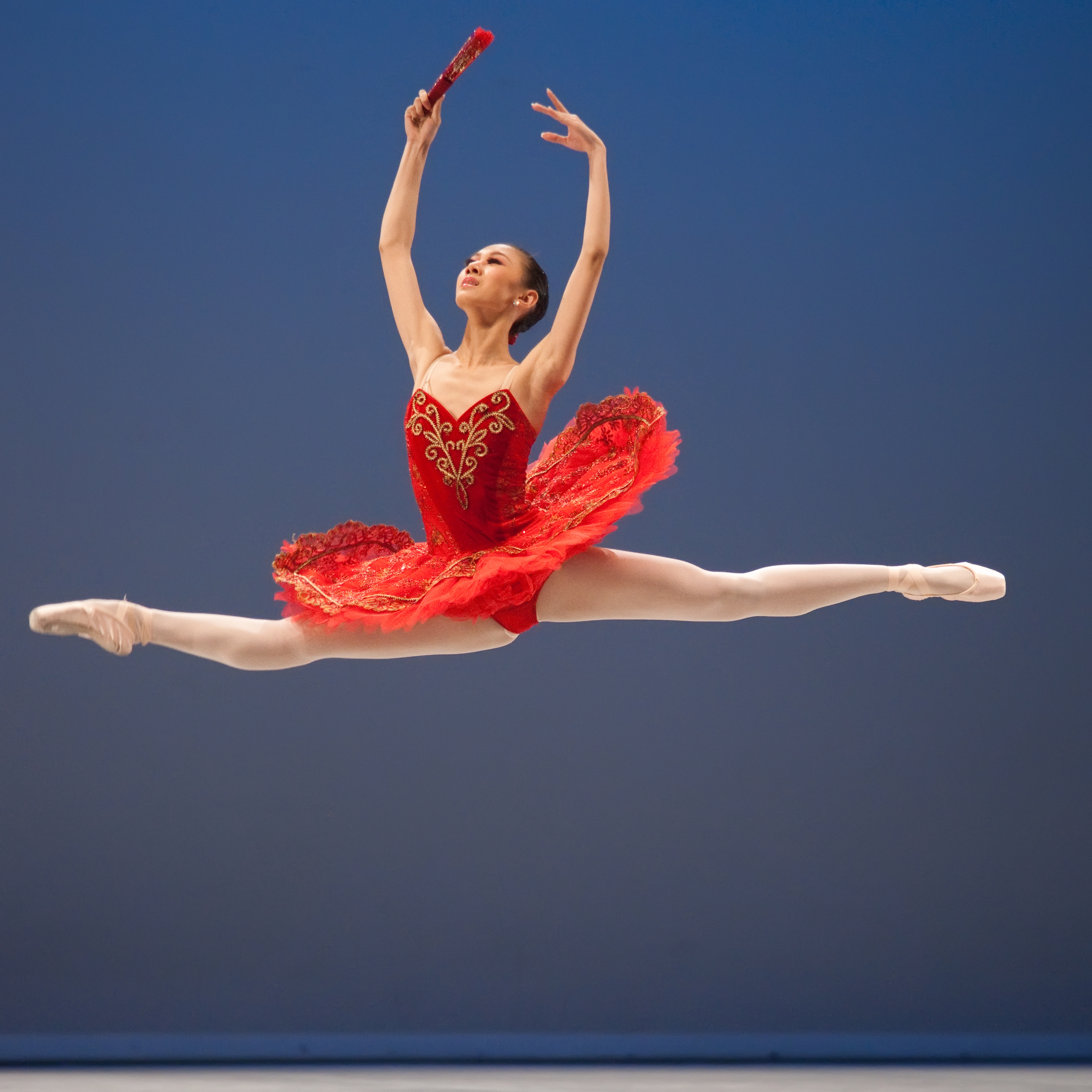
A grand jeté

(French pronunciation: [ɡʁɑ̃ ʒəte]) A long horizontal jump, starting from one leg and landing on the other. Known as a split in the air. It is most often done forward and usually involves doing full leg splits in mid-air. It consists basically of a grand écart with a moving jump. The front leg brushes straight into the air in a grand battement, as opposed to from développé (or an unfolding motion). The back leg follows making the splits in the air. It can be performed en avant (forward), à la seconde (to the side), en arrière (backward), and en tournant (turning en dedans). The dancer must remember to hit the fullest split at the height of the jump, with weight pushed slightly forward, giving the dancer a gliding appearance.

=== Grand pas ===
A suite of individual dances that serves as a showpiece for lead dancers, demi-soloists, and in some cases the corps de ballet. Often regarded as the pièce de résistance of a ballet. It usually consists of an entrée, a grand adage, and a coda, which brings the suite to a conclusion. After the adage, it may include a dance for the corps de ballet (often referred to as the ballabile), variations for demi-soloists, variations for lead ballerina and danseur, or some combinations of these.

Various types of "grand pas" are found in ballet, including:

- A grand pas d'action is one that contributes to a ballet's story.
- In a grand pas classique, classical ballet technique prevails and no character dances are included.
- A grand pas de deux serves as the pièce de résistance for the principal male and female characters of a full-length ballet.
- A grand pas danced by three or four dancers is a grand pas de trois or grand pas de quatre, respectively.

=== Grand plié ===
(French pronunciation: [ɡʁɑ̃ plije]) A full plié or bending of the knees. Throughout the movement, the pelvis should be kept neutral, the back straight and aligned with the heels, the legs turned out, and the knees over the feet. From standing to bent this should be fluid. A purpose of the grand plié is to warm up the ankles and stretch the calves. In a grande plié the heels come off the ground in first, fourth, and fifth position.

== H ==
=== Hortensia ===
"A male dancer's step in which the dancer jumps into the air with the legs drawn up, one in front of the other, then reverses their position [...] several times before landing with the feet apart again." This step can look akin to swimming in air.

== J ==
=== Jeté ===
(French pronunciation: [ʒəte]; 'thrown.') A leap in which one leg appears to be thrown in the direction of the movement (en avant, en arrière, or sideways). There are several kinds of jetés, including jeté / jeté ordinaire (RAD) / pas jeté (Rus.), grand jeté, and tour jeté (ABT) / grand jeté en tournant (Fr./Cecc.) / jeté entrelacé (Rus.), or the common compound step coupé jeté (en tournant).

- Jeté (jeté ordinaire/pas jeté) refers to a jump initiated en plié, with the pointed working foot brushing out in dégagé from cou-de-pied (derrière) to seconde (action similar to a non-Russian-style flat frappé), weight being transferred via a jump propelled by pushing off the standing leg from plié, the leading leg landing tombé and the foot of the other/former standing leg ending cou-de-pied (derrière). Some schools (including ABT at one point) may still refer to this as a petit jeté.
- Grand jeté:
  Grand jeté.
  see Coupé jeté en tournant, a jump initiated with a grand battement en avant of the leading leg while pushing off the trailing leg from plié (usually led into by some moving step such as chassé, glissade en avant, or pas couru), the trailing leg brushing to grand battement derrière while in the air, the jump ultimately landing on the leading leg. Resembles the splits (en l'air).
- Tour jeté / jeté en tournant ('turn'/'interlaced') is a grand jeté done turning: a jump initiated with a grand battement en avant of the leading leg, followed by a fouetté turning the direction of the body 180 degrees and the trailing leg brushing through to a grand battement derrière, the jump landing arabesque with the leading leg now the standing (landing) leg.
- Coupé jeté en tournant is a compound step, usually done in multiples en manège ('in a circle'), of a coupé (changing the supporting foot) initiating the first quarter of a turn leading into a grand jeté completing the 360-degree rotation of the turn.
- Petit jeté in RAD and the French school refers to a one-footed changement passing through cou-de-pied and is what other schools refer to as a changement emboîté.

== M ==
=== Manèges ===
Manèges is a classical ballet term meaning “circular.” It describes when a dancer does steps in a circular pattern around the stage.

Usually, manèges will be a repetition of one or two steps, but can also be a combination of several. For example, a coupé jeté manèges is typically done by a male dancer in a coda of a classical pas de deux. Ballerinas will often do piqué manèges in a variation or also in a coda.

== O ==
=== Ouvert, ouverte ===
(French pronunciation: [uvɛʁ(t)]; 'open, opened.') Converse of fermé(e) ('closed'). Ouvert may refer to positions (the second and fourth positions of the feet are positions ouvertes), limbs, directions, or certain exercises or steps. In the French School, this term is used to indicate a position or direction of the body similar to

== P ==
=== Partnering ===
Dancing performed by a pair of dancers, typically a male and a female, in which the pair strives to achieve a harmony of coordinated movements so that the audience remains unaware of the mechanics. A dance that is focused on a single pair of partnering dancers is a pas de deux. For a male dancer, partnering may involve lifting, catching, and carrying a partner, and providing assistance and support for leaps, promenades and pirouettes.

=== Pas ===
(French pronunciation: [pɑ]; literally 'step.') A dance, or a suite of dances as in grand pas.

=== Pas de basque ===
(French pronunciation: [pɑ d(ə) bask]; 'step of the Basques.') Halfway between a step and a leap, taken on the floor (glissé) or with a jump (sauté); it can be done moving toward the front or toward the back. This step can also be found in Scottish highland dance.

Starting in fifth position croisé, a dancer executes a plié while brushing the downstage leg out to tendu front. The downstage leg does a demi rond de jambe to the opposite corner while the body turns to face that corner. Weight is quickly transferred to that brushed leg, now upstage, allowing the dancer to pass the newly downstage leg through first position via a chassé passé to fourth devant, ending croisé the new corner, and finishing by bringing the upstage leg in to close fifth.

=== Pas de bourrée ===
Jazz dance pas de bourrée, which differs slightly from ballet

(French pronunciation: [pɑ d(ə) buʁe]; 'step of bourrée.') A quick sequence of movements beginning with extension of the first leg while demi-plié, closing the first leg to the second as both transition to relevé (demi-pointe or pointe), extending the second leg to an open position while relevé, and closing the first leg to the second in demi-plié (or optionally with legs straight if performed quickly or as the final step of an enchainement). Variants include:

- pas de bourrée derrière – 'behind' / pas de bourrée devant – 'front'
- pas de bourrée dessus – 'over,' initially closing the working foot in front / pas de bourrée dessous – 'under,' initially closing the working foot behind
- pas de bourrée en arriere – 'traveling backward' / pas be bourrée en avant – 'traveling forward'
- pas be bourrée en tournant en dedans – 'turning inward' / pas de bourrée en tournant en dehors – 'turning outward'
- pas de bourrée ouvert – 'open,' an open->closed->open sequence
- pas de bourrée piqué – 'pricked,' with working leg quickly lifted after pricking the floor
- pas de bourrée couru – 'running,' also 'flowing like a river'

=== Pas de chat ===
Pas de chat

(French pronunciation: [pɑ d(ə) ʃa]; 'step of the cat.') A traveling sideways jump where while mid-air the legs are successively bent, brought to retiré, feet as high up as possible, knees apart. The Dance of the Cygnets from Swan Lake involves sixteen pas de chat performed by four dancers holding hands, arms interlaced.

In the Cecchetti and French schools, this may be referred to as a saut de chat ('jump of the cat').

==== Grand pas de chat ====
A jump where the leading leg extends forward through grand battement (a "French pas de chat") or développé (an "Italian pas de chat") and the trailing leg remains in retiré until landing.

==== "Russian" pas de chat ====
A jump where the legs are successively brought to attitude derrière instead of retiré. This variant of the pas de chat appears in several Petipa ballets (e.g. the fourth variation in Paquita).

=== Pas de cheval ===
(French pronunciation: [pɑ də ʃ(ə)val]; 'step of the horse.') A movement of the leg (when extended) through first or fifth position, to cou-de-pied and then energetically out to a pointe tendue through a petit développé.

=== Pas de deux ===
('Step of two.') A dance duet, usually performed by a female and a male dancer.

=== Pas de poisson ===
(French pronunciation: [pɑ də pwasɔ̃]; 'step of the fish.') A type of soubresaut, or a jump without a change of feet. From fifth position, a dancer executes a deep demi-plié and then jumps arching the back with straight legs behind, so that the body is curved like a fish jumping out of water. Also called temps de poisson.

=== Pas de quatre ===
('Step of four.') A dance by four dancers.

=== Pas de trois ===
('Step of three.') A dance by three dancers.

=== Pas de valse ===
(French pronunciation: [pɑ d(ə) vals]; 'waltz step.') A sequence of three steps—fondu, relevé, elevé (down, up, up)—always advancing (like a march), done in three counts to music generally in 3/4 time, traveling in any direction or while turning (en tournant). The feet do not assemble (or "cross each other") on any step as occurs in a balancé; each step instead passes the last.

=== Passé ===
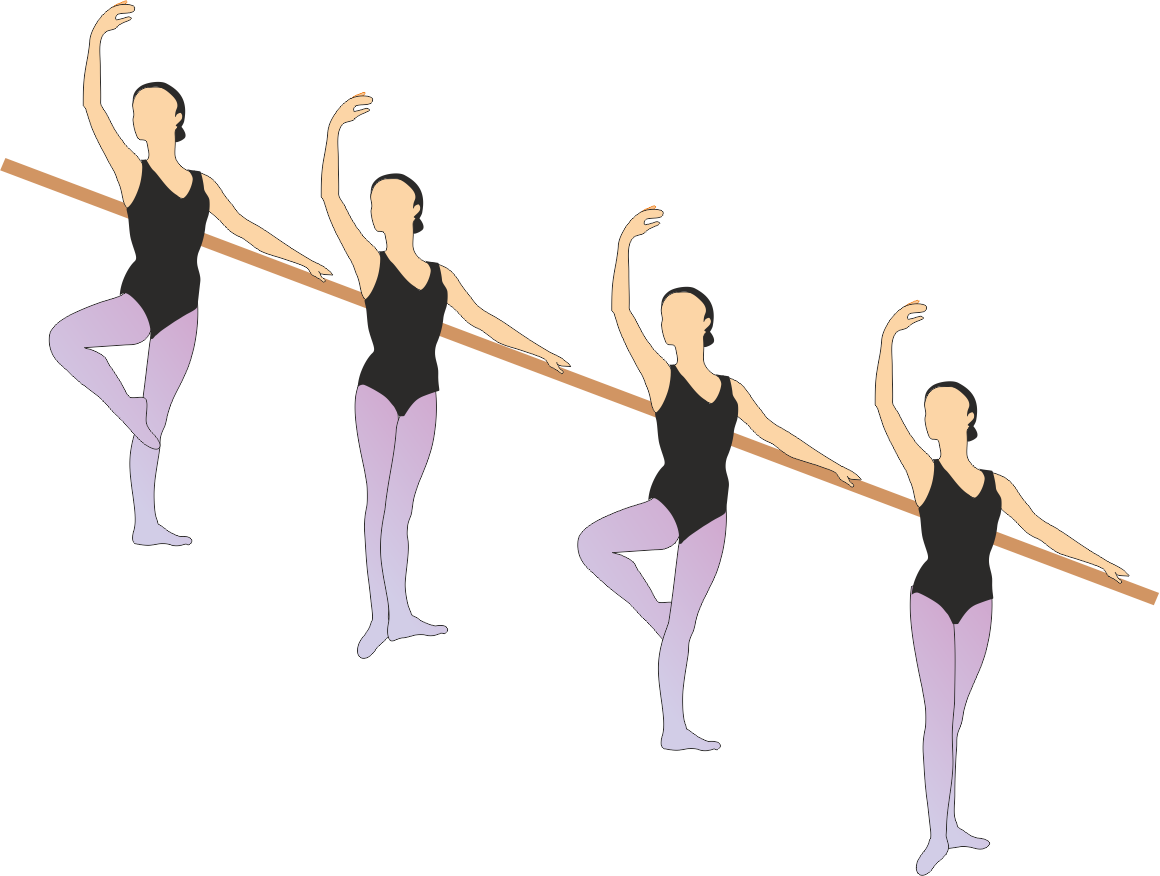
Passé

(French pronunciation: [pɑse]; literally 'passed.') Passing the working foot through from back to front or vice versa. Generally used to refer to retiré passé, indicating passing the foot of the working leg past the knee of the supporting leg (on, below, or above) from back to front or front to back. Retiré passé may initiate or complete by sliding the working foot up or down the supporting leg from or to the floor, may be executed directly from an open position such as in pirouette from fourth, or may transition from knee to another position such as arabesque or attitude (as in développé). A chassé can also pass through from back to front as in (sissonne) failli: chassé passé.

=== Penché ===
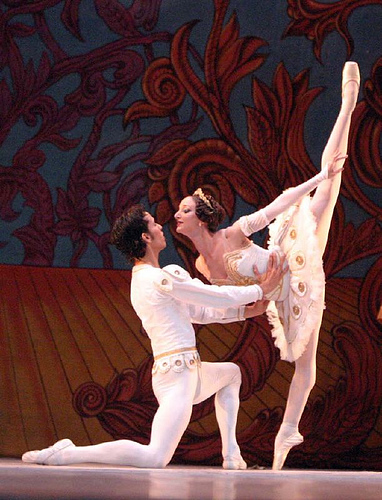
Arabesque penché

(French pronunciation: [pɑ̃ʃe]; 'tilted'.) Tilting the body forward about the hip of the supporting leg so that the head is lower than the working leg, as in arabesque penché. Doing a split while standing on one foot. The dancer lifts the leg more than 90 degrees.

=== Petit battement ===
Petit battement is when a ballet dancer swiftly moves his/her leg in front then behind their calf. This motion is normally done at the barre during warm-up. A more advanced dancer would only move their knee, to complete this action.

=== Petit saut ===
(French pronunciation: [p(ə)ti so]; 'small jump.') A small jump, in which the feet do not change positions in mid-air; also called temps levé sauté in the Vaganova vocabulary.

=== Piqué ===
(French pronunciation: [pike]; meaning 'pricked.') A movement in which the raised, pointed foot of the working leg is lowered so that it pricks the floor and then either rebounds upward (as in battement piqué) or becomes a supporting foot. In the latter case, it may be used to transfer a stance from one leg to the other by stepping out directly onto an en pointe or demi-pointe foot and often immediately precedes a movement that entails elevating the new working leg, such as a piqué arabesque.

In Cecchetti and RAD, the term posé is used instead of piqué outside of the battement: piqué arabesque and ABT piqué turn/tour piqué (en dedans) / Rus. tour dégagé = RAD/Cecc. posé arabesque and posé turn/posé en tournant.

=== Piqué turn ===
A tour piqué or piqué turn is a traveling turn executed by the leg stepping out onto an en pointe or demi-pointe foot becoming the supporting leg while the working leg moves from plié to retiré derrière, if an en dedans turn, or retiré devant, if an en dehors turn. In fast piqué turns, petit retiré may be executed instead (i.e. working foot at cou-de-pied). Most commonly done en dedans, piqué turns en dehors are also referred to as lame ducks.

=== Pirouette ===
Pirouette supported by male dancer

(French pronunciation: [piʁwɛt]) A non-traveling turn on one leg, of one or more rotations, often starting with one or both legs in plié and rising onto demi-pointe or pointe. The non-supporting leg is generally held in retiré devant ('front')—when initiated from fourth, this would be a retiré passé—but could also be held in other positions such as seconde. Pirouettes are most often executed en dehors, turning outwards in the direction of the working leg, but can also be done en dedans, turning inwards in the direction of the supporting leg. (e.g. En dehors turns clockwise (to the right) if the right leg is working and the left leg supporting/standing.) Spotting is employed to help maintain balance. A pirouette may return to its starting position or finish in arabesque or attitude.

In other genres of dance, such as jazz or modern, it is common to see pirouettes performed with legs parallel (i.e. sixth position) instead of turned out as in ballet.

=== Plié ===
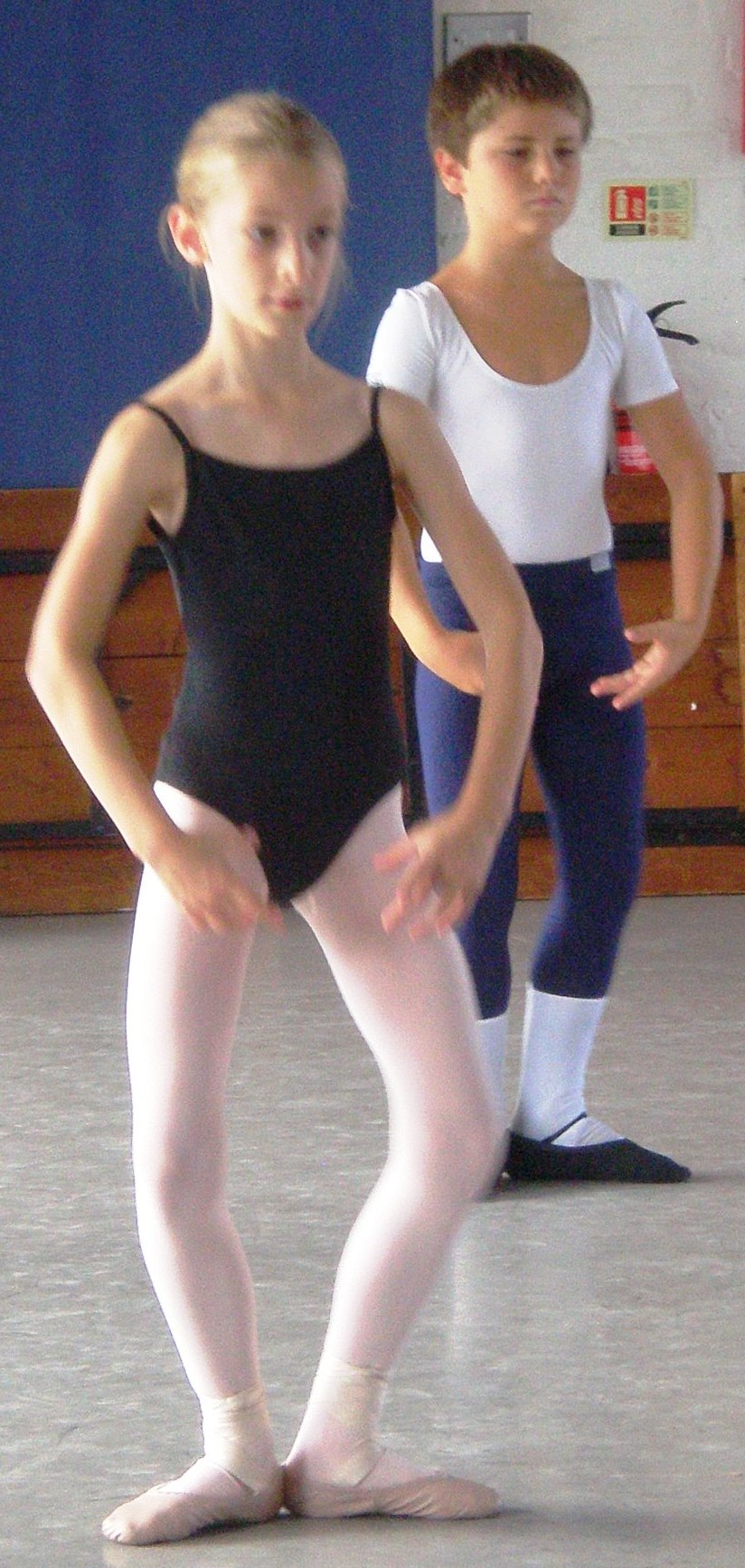
Demi-plié

(French pronunciation: [plije]; literally 'bent.') A smooth and continuous bending of the knees outward with the upper body held upright.

In demi-plié, (in a first, second, fourth, and fifth position) a dancer bends the knees while maintaining turnout. While in a demi-plié position one must remember to have proper alignment. Head over shoulders, shoulders over hips over knees and knees over feet. When initiating a demi-plié one must pull up and resist against going down. Lengthening from the center and back of the head and pressing down through the floor through the balls of the feet. As you are bending your knees you have to maintain the proper alignment and make sure that the knees are going over the big toe. Creating proper turn out by rotating the inner thighs forward and you go down. Making sure to keep the pelvis in line as you go down and up so that you do not release your seat and stick your chest forward. at the same time engaging your core (stomach) by pressing your naval towards your spine. The knees bending directly above the line of the toes without releasing the heels from the floor. As soon as the bottom of the bend is reached, the bend is reversed and the legs are straightened.

In grand plié, (in first, second, fourth, and fifth position) While doing a grand-plié position one must remember to have proper alignment. Head over shoulders, shoulders over hips over knees and knees over feet. When initiating a grand-plié one must pull up and resist against going down. Lengthening from the center and back of the head and pressing down through the floor through the balls of the feet. As you are bending your knees you have to maintain the proper alignment and make sure that the knees are going over the big toe. Heels come off the ground past demi-plié with the feet ending in a demi-pointe at the bottom of the bend. Making sure to create proper turn out by rotating the inner thighs forward and you go down. Making sure to keep the pelvis in line as you go down and up so that you do not release your seat and stick your chest forward, and at the same time engaging your core(stomach) by pressing your navel towards your spine. As soon as the bottom of the bend is reached, the bend is reversed and the legs are straightened. *Note: Heels do not come up off the floor in a second position.

=== Pointe, en ===
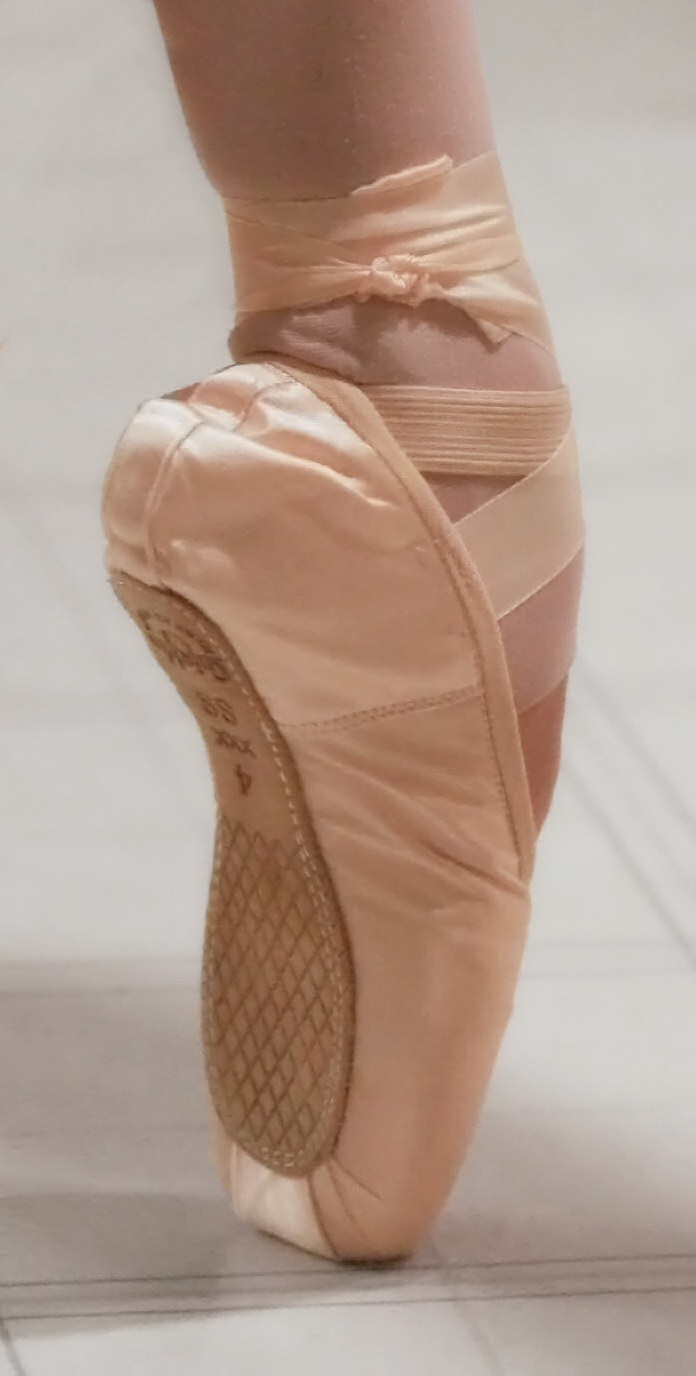
An en pointe foot in a pointe shoe

(French pronunciation: [ɑ̃ pwɛ̃t]) Supporting one's body weight on the tips of the toes, usually while wearing structurally reinforced pointe shoes.

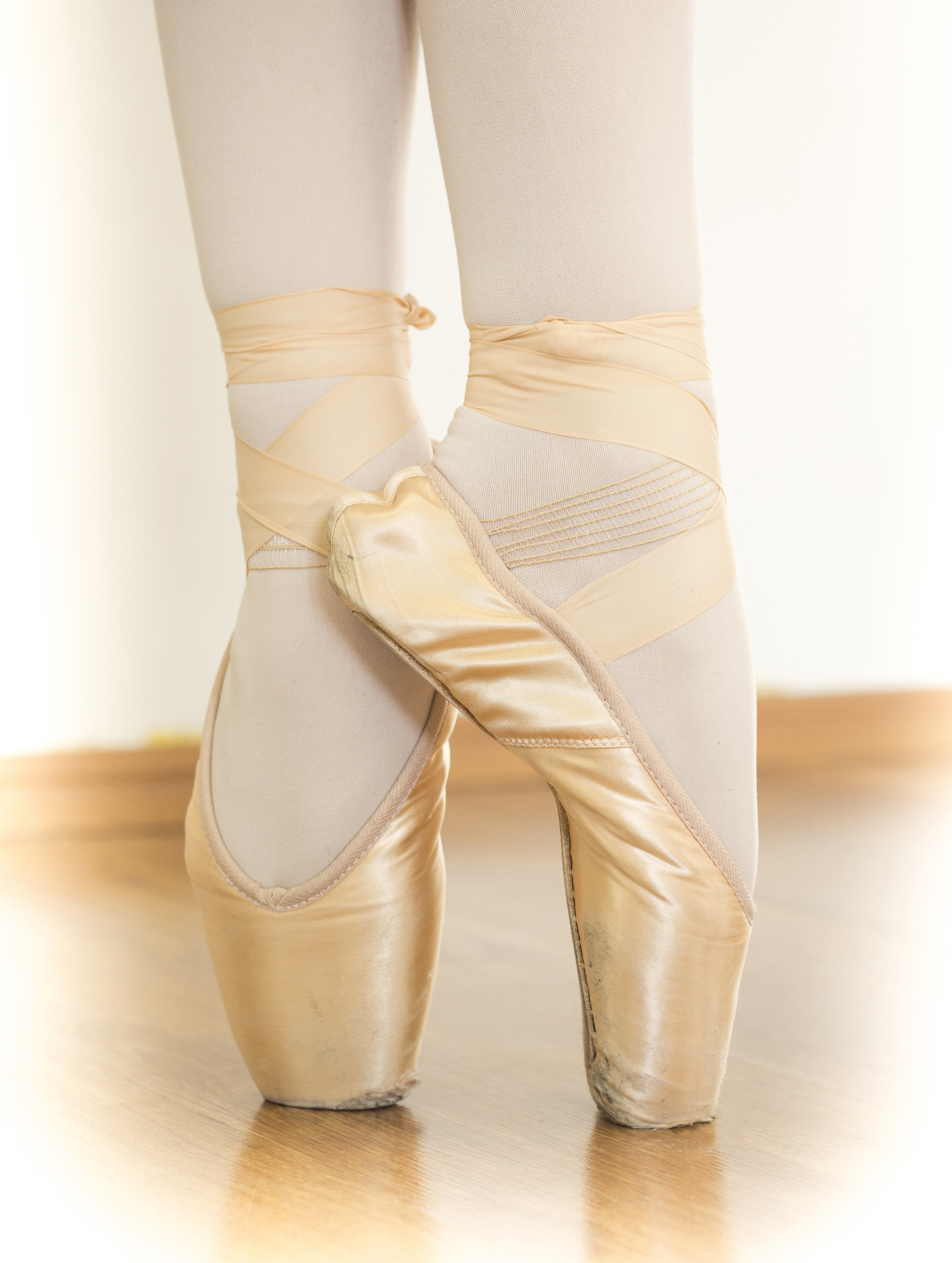
A ballet dancer demonstrating fifth position en pointe.

=== Pointe technique ===
The part of classical ballet technique that concerns pointe work (dancing on the tips of the toes).

=== Pointe work ===
Performing steps while on the tips of the toes, with feet fully extended and wearing pointe shoes, a structurally reinforced type of shoe designed specifically for this purpose. Most often performed by women.

=== Poisson ===
(French pronunciation: [pwasɔ̃]; literally 'fish.') A body position in which the back is arched and legs are crossed in fifth position or the working leg is held retiré. This position may be assumed while jumping or in partnering lifts, as in a fish dive.

=== Port de bras ===
(French pronunciation: [pɔʁ d(ə) bʁa]; 'carriage of the arms.') An exercise for the movement of the arms (and in some schools, the upper body) to different positions. For example, a basic port de bras exercise could move from fifth en bas ('low') (i.e. bras bas or preparatory position) to first arm position, to second arm position, back down to fifth en bas. A full port de bras could move from en bas to en haut ('high', i.e. overhead) and back down. Port de bras movements vary by school and by action.

The phrase port de bras is used in some schools and parts of the world to indicate a bending forward, backward, or circularly of the body at the waist, generally to be followed by bringing the upper body back to center/upright again, e.g. "port de bras forward", "port de bras back", "circular port de bras/grand port de bras". Bending at the waist is otherwise known as cambré.

=== Posé ===
French pronunciation: [poze]; A term of the Cecchetti school and RAD. From a fondu, a dancer steps with a straight leg onto an en pointe or demi-pointe foot, then brings the working leg to cou-de-pied, so that if the step is repeated, the working leg will execute a petit développé. This can be done in any direction or turning (the later also known as tour piqué).

=== Positions of the arms ===
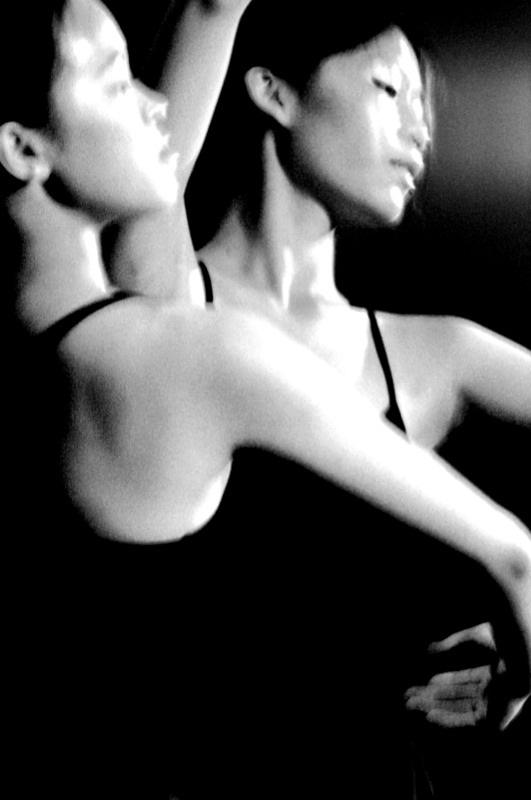
Arms held in Cecchetti's "Spanish fourth" position

There are two basic positions of the arms. In one, the dancer keeps the fingers of both arms almost touching to form an oval/round shape, either near the hips, at navel level, or raised above the dancer's head. In the other, the arms are extended to the sides with the elbows slightly bent. These positions may be combined to give other positions.

Different schools, such as Vaganova, French, and Cecchetti, Russian often use different names for similar arm positions. The Russian school names three arm positions while the other schools name five.

- Bras bas ('arms low') (RAD)/bras au repos ('at rest') (French), preparatory position (Rus.), or fifth en bas (Cecc.) holds the arms low and slightly rounded near the hip.
- First position holds the arms round or oval in front of the body somewhere between the naval and breastbone (depending on the school and movement), the fingertips of the hands approaching each other. In Cecchetti, the hands stay a little lower at tutu height.
- Second position in all schools holds the arms extended out to the side, the inner part of the upper arm parallel to the ground with the forearms and palms facing the audience. The roundness and shoulder height of the arms varies by school.
- Third position in the French/RAD schools holds one arm in second with the other arm in first. The Russian equivalent of this may be petit bras.
  - Third position in Cecchetti holds one arm in a Cecchetti first and the other arm in demi-seconde.
  - Third position in the Russian school holds both arms slightly rounded overhead. This is equivalent to fifth position (en haut) in other schools.
- Fourth position or fourth ouvert ('open') consists of one arm en haut ('high,' i.e. raised overhead) and the other open to second position. This is called fourth en haut in Cecchetti. The Russian school does not designate a fourth position; the Russian equivalent may be grand bras.
  - Fourth position croisé ('crossed') or Spanish fourth in Cecchetti consists of one arm en haut and the other held in first position/Cecchetti fifth en avant.
- Fifth position in the French/RAD schools and fifth en haut in Cecchetti holds the arms en haut slightly rounded, fingertips approaching each other. This is called third position in the Russian school, which does not designate a fifth (or fourth) position. Cecchetti also recognizes a fifth en bas, the preparatory/bras bas position in other schools, and a fifth en avant, arms rounded between naval/chest height, known as first position in other schools.

Additionally:

- Demi-bras ('half arms') holds the arms between first and second position, outstretched with palms presented towards the audience.
- Demi-seconde ('half second') holds the arms low out to the side as if grazing the tutu, palms generally down.

=== Positions of the body ===
There are eight to eleven positions of the body in ballet, eight in Cecchetti and RAD and ten or eleven in the Russian and French schools. The general positions are croisé, à la quatrième, effacé, à la seconde, écarté, and épaulé. Cecchetti and RAD's eight include croisé devant, à la quatrième devant, effacé (devant), à la seconde, croisé derrière, écarté, épaulé, and à la quatrième derrière. The Russian school further divides effacé and épaulé into effacé devant, effacé derrière, épaulé devant, and épaulé derrière, and the Russian arm positions on croisé derrière are the converse of Cecchetti/RAD's. In addition, the French school further divides écarté into écarté devant and écarté derrière.

=== Positions of the feet ===
The standard, basic placements of feet on the floor. Modern-day classical ballet employs five positions, known as the first position, second position, third position, fourth position, and fifth position.

=== Pulling Up ===
Pulling up is critical to the simple act of rising up on balance and involves the use of the entire body. The feeling of being simultaneously grounded and "pulled up" is necessary for many steps in ballet. To pull up, a dancer must lift the ribcage and sternum but keep the shoulders down, relaxed and centered over the hips, which requires use of the abdominal muscles. In addition, the dancer must stabilize the pelvis, maintaining a neutral position, and keep the back straight to avoid arching and going off balance.

== Q ==
=== Quatre ===
(French pronunciation: [katʁ]) Four of something, as in pas de quatre (a dance by four dancers).

=== Quatrième ===
(French pronunciation: [katʁijɛːm]) Meaning 'fourth'.

== R ==
=== Relevé ===
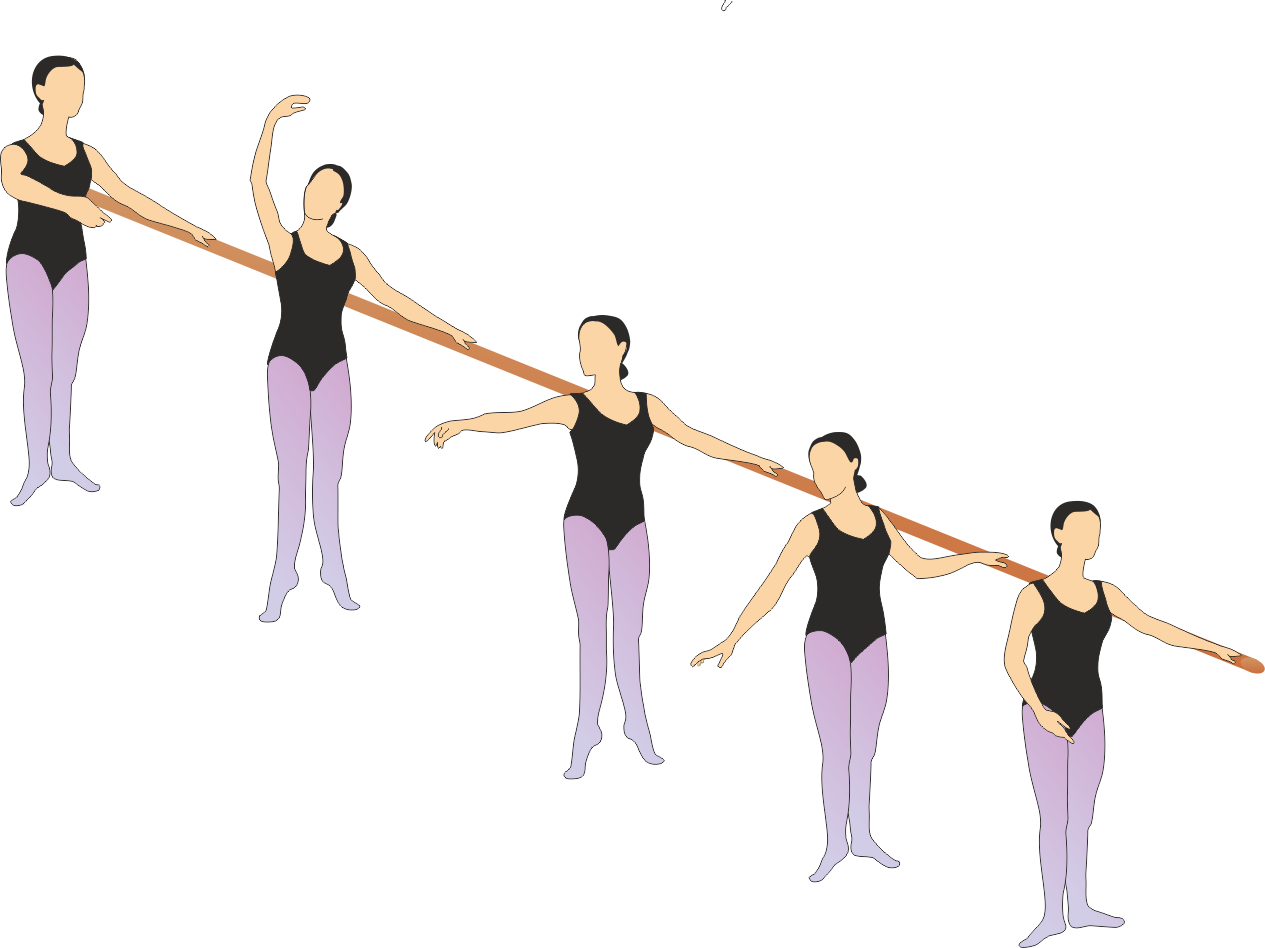
Relevé exercise at a barre

(French pronunciation: [ʁəlve]; 'raised, lifted.') Rising onto the balls (demi-pointe) or toes (pointe) of one or both feet. See also élevé.

=== Relevé lent ===
(French pronunciation: [ʁəlve lɑ̃]; 'lifted slowly.') Abbreviation of battement relevé lent. Term from the Russian school indicating raising the leg slowly from pointe tendue to 45 degrees or higher off the ground. Contrasts with (battement) tendu jeté, aka dégagé, in which the leg brushes out propulsively from a high position through tendu to elevated off the ground, and (temps) développé, in which the leg passes through retiré (or petit retiré) to à la hauteur or demi-hauteur, i.e. elevated off the ground.

=== Renversé ===
(French pronunciation: [ʁɑ̃vɛʁse]) An attitude presented on a turn.

=== Retiré ===
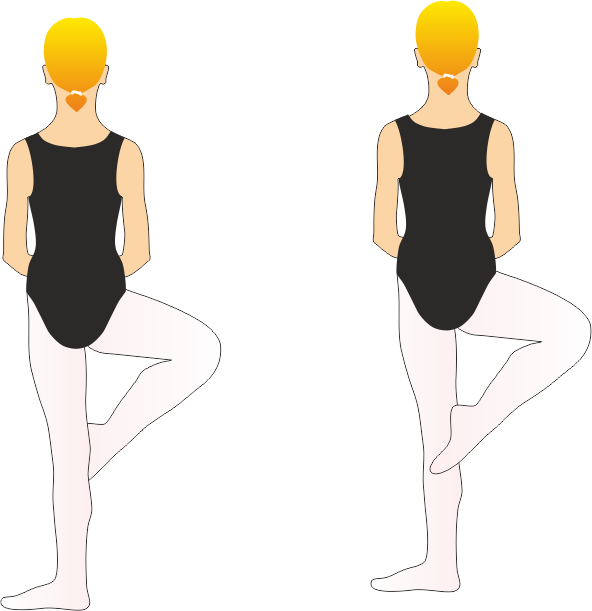
Working leg in retiré devant and retiré derrière

(French pronunciation: [ʁətiʁe]) A position of the working leg in which the leg is raised turned out and bent at the knee to the side so that the toe is located directly in front of (retiré devant) or behind (retiré derrière) the supporting knee. This is commonly used in pirouettes and as an intermediate position in other movements such as développé front.

=== Révérence ===
(French pronunciation: [ʁeveʁɑ̃s]; 'reverence, bow.') A bow, curtsy, or grand gesture of respect to acknowledge the teacher and the pianist after class or the audience and orchestra after a performance. After a classical ballet, a bow or choreographed révérence may be performed in character.

=== Revoltade ===
(French pronunciation: [ʁəvɔltad]) A bravura jump in which one lands on the leg from which one pushes off after that leg travels around the other leg which is lifted to a level that is parallel with the floor. There are several variants, the passing leg may pass around the lifted leg in a passé position, or it may be extended and parallel to the lifted leg, or it may be extended and close to perpendicular to the lifted leg. This last variant is also known as a 540.

=== Rond de jambe ===
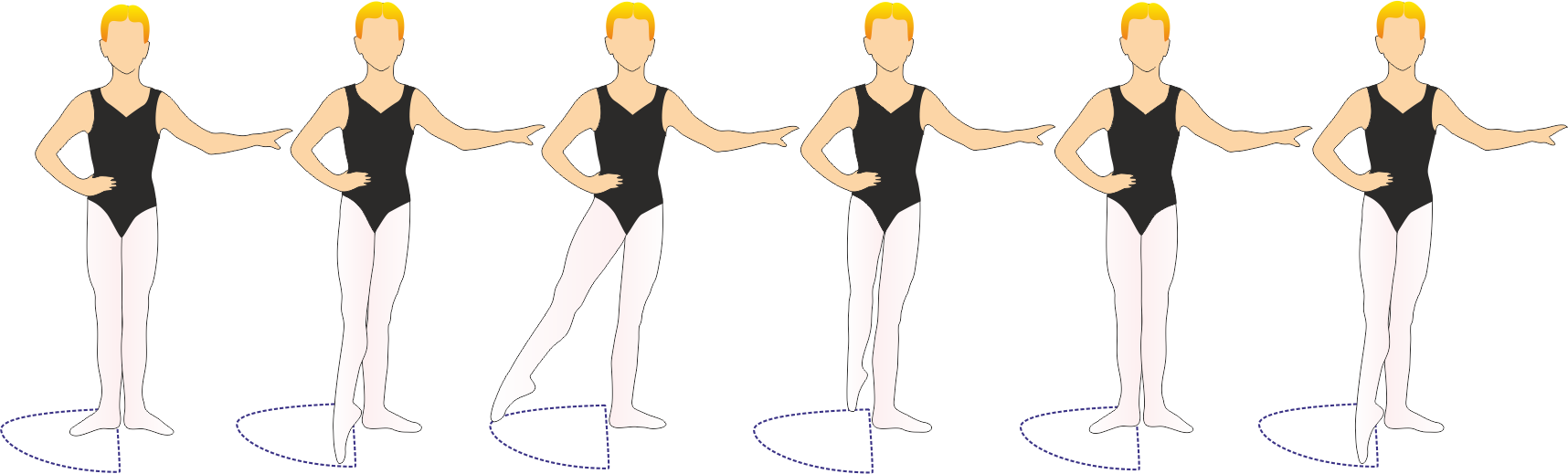
Rond de jambe

(French pronunciation: [ʁɔ̃ d(ə) ʒɑ̃b]; meaning 'leg circle.') Half-circle made by the pointed foot, from fourth front or back through second position to the opposite fourth and returning through first position again to repeat, in effect tracing out the letter "D". Starting front going back is called rond de jambe en dehors while starting back and going front is called rond de jambe en dedans.

- Rond de jambe à terre/par terre: ('on the ground.') The extended leg with pointed toe remains on the ground to sweep around in a semi-circle.
- Rond de jambe attitude: the leg is swung around from front to side and into attitude position behind as the supporting foot goes en pointe. (See also attitude.)
- Rond de jambe en l'air: ('in the air.') The leg is lifted and sustained to the side (à la seconde), with movement being limited to below the knee. If the thigh is held at 90 degrees from the body, the toe draws a circle approximately between the knee of the supporting leg and second position in the air. If the thigh is held lower (e.g. 45 degrees), the circle is drawn to the calf of the supporting leg. This is commonly done in singles, doubles, and/or sauté.
- Grand rond de jambe (en l'air): the leg is extended and sustained at grand battement height to draw a semi-circle in the air.
- Demi-grand rond de jambe (en l'air): the leg is extended and sustained off the ground while moving from fourth devant or derrière to second or vice versa, thus drawing only half of the full semi-circle.

=== Royale ===
(French pronunciation: [ʁwajal]) Another name for changement battu. A changement with a beating of the legs preceding the foot change. Example: with the right foot in front in fifth position, plié, jump, beat the right thigh against the left (back thigh) and continue with a changement moving the right leg to behind the left, landing fifth position left foot front.

== S ==
=== Sauté ===
(French pronunciation: [sote]; literally 'jumped.') Used to indicate a step executed jumping, e.g. sauté arabesque is an arabesque performed while jumping on the supporting leg.

=== Saut de chat ===
(French pronunciation: [so də ʃa]) In RAD and American ballet, saut de chat refers to a jump similar to a grand jeté differing in that the front leg extends through a développé instead of a grand battement. This is called a grand jété développé in other schools.

In the French and Cecchetti schools, saut de chat refers to what RAD/ABT call a pas de chat.

=== Scáfuri ===
A rise, from flat to demi-pointe (from the balls to the tips of both feet), usually done multiple times in quick succession where the legs are turned out in a grand pas position.

=== Second position (feet) ===
Legs turned out with feet pointing in opposite directions and heels at least shoulder-width apart.

=== Sickle ===
A term that refers to the reverse of a winging, indicating a foot where the heel is too far back so the toes are in front of the ankle and heel, breaking the line of the leg at the ankle. If a dancer sickles an en pointe or demi-pointe foot, the ankle could collapse to the outside, resulting in a sprain. A working foot should be straight to the side and mildly winged to the front or back.

=== Sissonne ===
Sissonnes

(French pronunciation: [sisɔn]) Although commonly thought to mean a scissor step, sissonnes are in fact named after the originator of the step. There are many types of sissonne, but all push off the floor with two feet and land on one. A sissone simple/ ordinaire devant starts in fifth position, shows fifth position in the air and lands in cou-de-pied devant. A sissonne fermée (close) has the dancer perform a medium to large jump from two feet, springing in any direction and leaving an extended leg behind, the ‘fermé’ is then a fast closing of the extended leg back into fifth position. A sissonne ouverte (open) will finish in the extended position. Advanced dancers can often be seen splitting their legs in a sissonne fermée and ouverte, this has perhaps led to some believing sissonne to be a ‘scissor step’. For reference, ‘scissors’ in French is ‘Ciseaux’ [see-ZOH]. Pas de ciseaux [pah duh see-ZOH] - a scissor step, is in advanced step in which following a temps levé from the left leg with the right leg devant, the legs pass each other at the height of the jump and the left leg is then immediately thrust backwards to land on the right leg with the left leg in arabesque (en fondue).

=== Soubresaut ===
(French pronunciation: [subʁəso]) A sudden spring or small jump from both feet, traveling forward in either first, third, or fifth position and landing on both feet in the same position as they started.

=== Sous-sous ===
(French pronunciation: [su su]; literally 'under-under.') A relevé, or rise, into a tight fifth position, feet touching and ankles crossed, giving the appearance of one foot with two heels. A term from the Cecchetti school, sus-sous ('over-under') is the equivalent term in the French and Russian schools.

=== Soutenu en tournant ===
(French pronunciation: [sutny ɑ̃ tuʁnɑ̃]; 'sustained.') Similar to tours chaînés (déboulés), a soutenu turn is a turn usually done in multiples in quick succession. The dancer first executes a demi-plié while extending the leading leg in tendu, stepping onto that leg en pointe/demi-pointe (making it the standing leg), then bringing the other leg to fifth position in front of the standing leg and finally turning (effectively, an unwinding motion). At the end of the rotation, the originally crossed-over foot in front should now be in fifth position behind.

Common abbreviation of assemblé soutenu en tournant (Cecc.). This is known as a glissade en tourant in the Russian school.

When done at the barre en demi-pointe to switch sides, only half a turn is done instead of a full turn, and the foot does not extend out into tendu. Differs from a détourné in that there is a repositioning of the feet on finishing (and a crossing action, if not initiated in fifth) vs. just a pivot to half turn.

=== Split ===
A configuration of the legs in which the legs are extended in opposite directions, either to the side (straddle split) or with one leg forward and the other back (front split). This is employed in various movements, including grand jeté and arabesque penchée.

=== Sur le cou-de-pied ===
(French pronunciation: [syʁ lə ku də pje]; literally 'on the neck of the foot.') The arched working foot is placed wrapped at the part of the leg between the base of the calf and the beginning of the ankle. On the accent devant (front), the heel of the working foot is placed in front of the leg, while the toes point to the back, allowing the instep (cou-de-pied in French) of the working foot to hug the lower leg. On the accent derrière (back), the heel of the working leg is placed behind the leg with the toes pointing to the back. The action of alternating between devant and derrière is seen in a petit battement.

== T ==
=== Temps levé ===
(French pronunciation: [tɑ̃ l(ə)ve]; literally 'time raised.') A term from the Cecchetti school indicating a hop on one foot while the other is raised in any position. The instep is fully arched when leaving the ground and the spring must come from the pointing of the toe and the extension of the leg after the demi-plié.

In the Cecchetti method, the specifically indicates a spring from fifth position while raising one foot to sur le cou-de-pied. In the Russian and French schools, this is known as sissonne simple.

=== Temps levé sauté ===
(French pronunciation: [tɑ̃ l(ə)ve sote]; literally 'time raised jumped.') A term from the Russian school. This can be executed with both feet from first, second, third, fourth, or fifth position starting with a demi-plié, leading to a jump in the air that lands with the feet in the same position as they started. (Otherwise known as simply a saut or sauté.) This can also be performed from one foot, while the other maintains the same position it had before starting the jump (i.e. the same as temps levé).

=== Temps lié ===
(French pronunciation: [tɑ̃ lje]; 'time linked.') A term indicating the transfer of weight from one leg to another by shifting through to the position without any sort of gliding or sliding movement.

=== Tendu ===
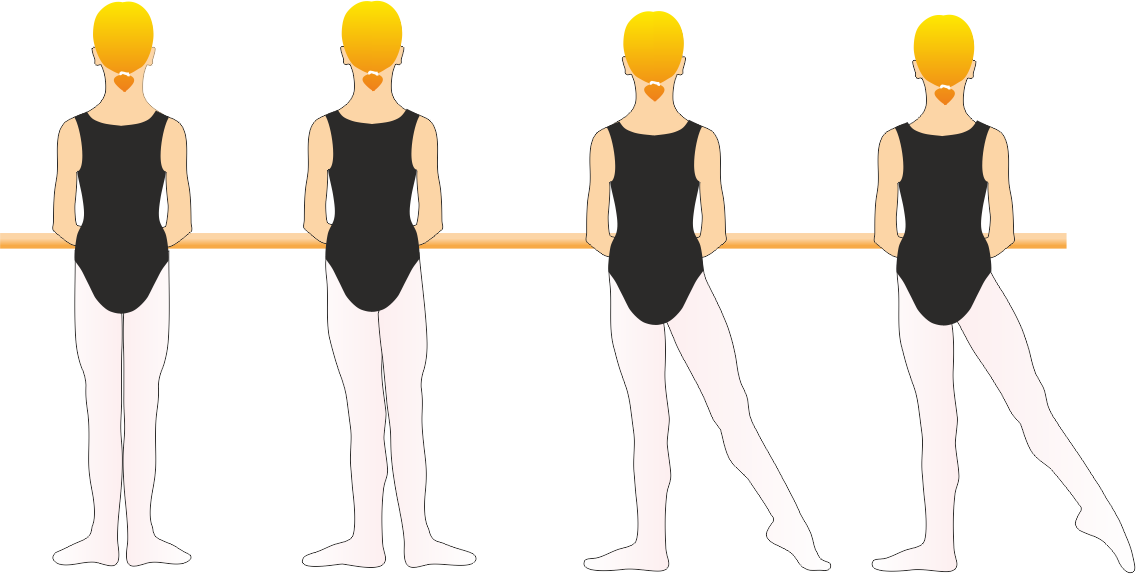
Tendu exercise at a barre

(French pronunciation: [tɑ̃dy]; literally 'stretched.') Gradually extending the working leg to the front (tendu devant), side, or back, passing from flat to demi-pointe to point where only the toes are touching the floor (tendu à terre), or only the pointed toes are elevated (en l'air). A common abbreviation for battement tendu.

=== Tights ===
Most ballet dancers wear tights in practices and performances unless in some contemporary and character dances or variations.

=== Tours en l'air ===
Tours en l'air.

(French pronunciation: [tuʁz ɑ̃ l ɛːʁ]; literally 'turn in the air.') A jump, typically done by males, with a full rotation in the air. The landing can be on both feet, on one leg with the other extended in attitude or arabesque, or down on one knee as at the end of a variation. A single tour is a 360° rotation, a double is 720°. Vaslav Nijinsky was known to perform triple tours en l'air.

=== Tombé ===
(French pronunciation: [tɔ̃be]; literally 'fallen.') The action of falling, typically used as a lead-in movement to a traveling step, e.g. pas de bourrée. A tombé en avant begins with a coupé to the front moving to a dégagé to fourth position devant, the extended foot coming down to the floor with the leg en plié, shifting the weight of the body onto the front leg and lifting the back leg off the floor in dégagé (to fourth derrière). A tombé through second starts with a dégagé of the leading leg to second position, the leading foot coming to the floor with the leg in plié, and the trailing leg lifting off the floor in dégagé to (the opposite-side) second position. A tombé en avant can also be initiated with a small sliding hop instead of a coupé.

In the Vaganova school, the full term is sissonne ouverte tombée.

=== Triple Runs ===
One big step, followed by two little steps, that can be done in a circle.

=== Turnout ===
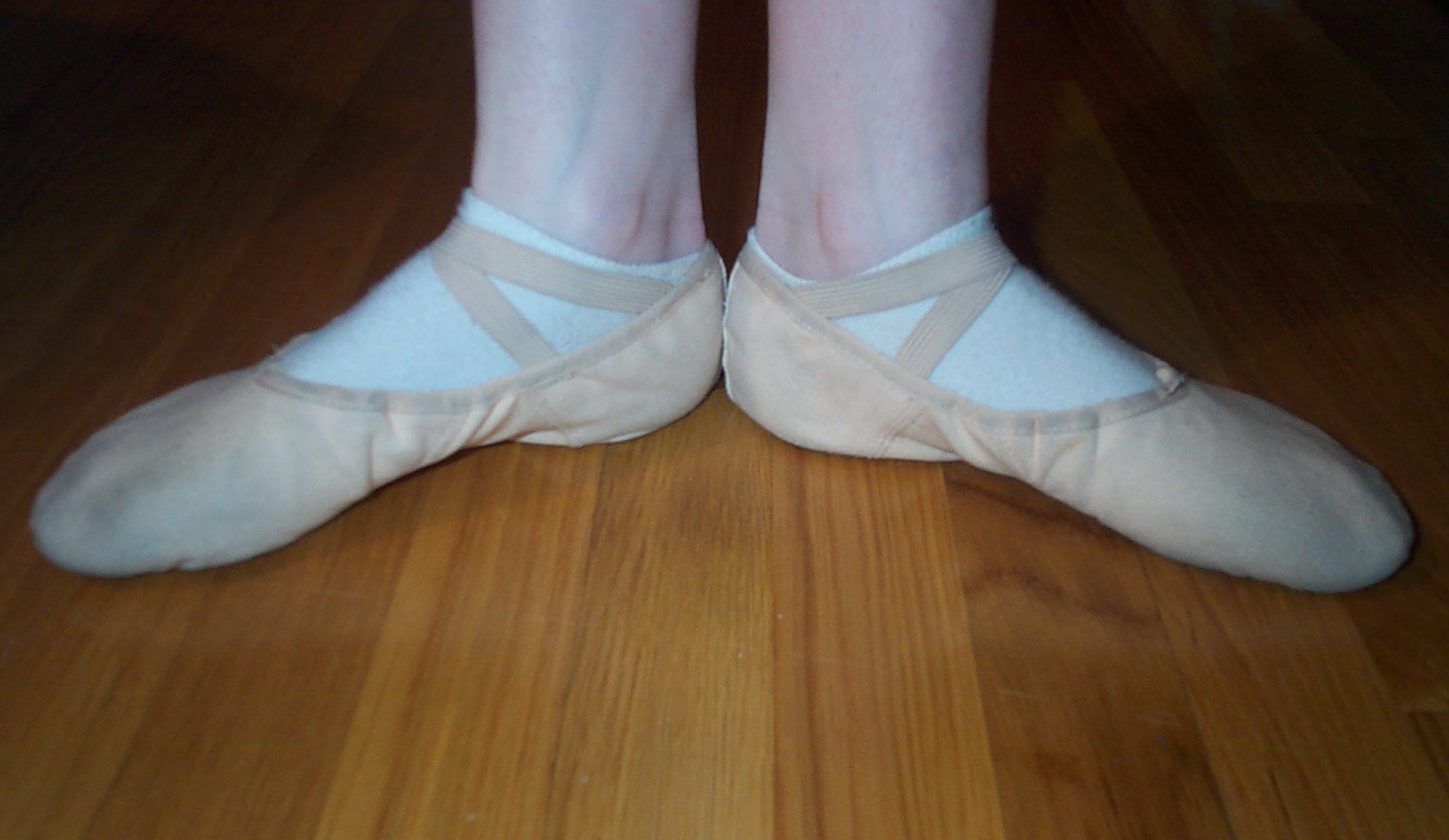
Turnout in first position of the feet

Rotation of the legs at the hips, resulting in knees and feet facing away from each other.

=== Tutu ===
A classic ballet skirt, typically flat at the waist or hip level, made of several layers of tulle or tarlatan.

== V ==
=== Variation ===
A dance typically done solo.

=== Virtuoso ===
A dancer with great technical ability and skill.

== W ==
=== Waltz ===
A sequence of steps performed in sync with waltz music, as in pas de waltz en tournant.

== See also ==
- Dance basic topics
- Glossary of dance moves

== General sources ==
- American Ballet Theatre's Online Ballet Dictionary
- Beaumont, Cyril W.; Idzikowski, Stanislas (1975) [1922]. A Manual of the Theory and Practice of Classical Theatrical Dancing (Méthode Cecchetti). New York: Dover Publications. ISBN 0-486-23223-9. OCLC 2304002.
- Kersley, Leo; Sinclair, Janet (1981) [1977]. A Dictionary of Ballet Terms (3rd revised ed.). New York: Da Capo Press. ISBN 0-306-80094-2. OCLC 4515340.
- Minden, Eliza Gaynor (2005). The Ballet Companion: A Dancer's Guide to the Technique, Traditions, and Joys of Ballet. New York: Simon and Schuster. ISBN 0-7432-6407-X. OCLC 58831597.
- Glossary of Dance Terms. New York: New York City Ballet. 2010.
- Ryman, Rhonda S. (1998). Dictionary of Classical Ballet Terminology (2nd ed.). London (Hightstown, NJ): Royal Academy of Dancing (distributed in the U.S.A. and Canada by Princeton Book). ISBN 0-9524848-0-3. OCLC 39625207.
