= Croisé =

Croisé may be:

- French for cross
- Croisé a dance step
- A French term for a participant in one of the Crusades
