= Battement =

Ballet movement

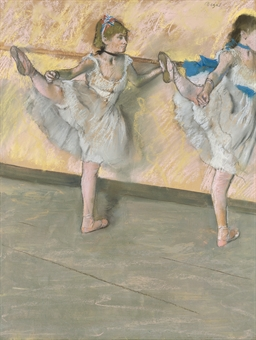
Battement

In ballet, battement is an alternating side-to-side movement of the working leg. Battements are typically performed in multiples, quickly and in rapid succession so that the working foot appears to be fluttering or vibrating. They are usually executed in front, to the side or in back The word battement is of French origin, meaning "beat".

== Variations ==
Grand battement with pirouettes

Battements are performed or executed in a variety of modes or configurations, for example:

- battement développé is usually a slow battement in which the leg is first lifted to retiré position, then fully extended (or "unfolded") passing through attitude position.
- battement fondu is a battement (usually slower) from fondu (both knees bent, working foot on the cou-de-pied of the supporting leg) position and extends until both legs are straight. Upon completion, the working leg may be à terre or en l'air (touching the floor or raised).
- battement frappé is a battement in which the foot moves from a flexed or 'cou-de-pied' position next to the ankle of the supporting leg, and extends out to a straight position quickly and forcefully, and by doing so hitting the floor (the so-called frappé). In the Russian school the foot is wrapped around the ankle, rather than flexed and does not strike the floor. In this case, the frappé comprises the working foot striking the ankle of the supporting leg. Battements frappés can be executed double, with beats alternating front and back of the standing leg's ankle before striking out.
- battement glissé (French school, Royal Academy of Dance UK), also known as battement dégagé (Italian School, Cecchetti) or battement jeté (Russian school, Vaganova), is a rapid battement where the toes are normally raised to just a few centimeters above the floor (literally a "sliding" battement).
- battement lent is a slow battement, normally taken as high as possible, which involves considerable control and strength. Both legs remain straight for the whole duration of the movement.
- battement tendu is a battement where the extended foot never leaves the floor. The working foot slides forward or sideways or backwards from the fifth or first position to reach the fourth or second position, lifting the heel off the floor and stretching the instep. It forms the preparation for many other positions, such as the ronds de jambe and pirouette positions. (stretched beating)
- battement tendu jeté (Russian school), also known as battement dégagé (Cecchetti) or battement glissé (French school), is executed a few centimeters off of the floor with the raised leg oriented upwards at angles of up to 45 degrees. The Royal Academy of Dance UK refers to this step as battement jeté, and it is distinguished from battement glissé by being at a 45-degree angle (higher than a battement glissé, lower than a grand battement).
- grand battement is a powerful battement action in which the dancer passes through dégagé and "throws" the working leg as high as possible, with both legs held straight.
- grand battement en cloche is a grand battement that alternates forwards and backwards, passing through the first position of the feet (literally: large battement with pendulum movement).
- petit battement is a battement in which the knee angle changes while the upper leg and thigh remain still. The working foot quickly alternates from the cou-de-pied position in the front to the cou-de-pied position in the back, slightly opening to the side.

== See also ==
- Can-can
- Glossary of ballet
