= Grand pas =

The Grand Pas des éléments, at Her Majesty's Theatre, 1847.

In classical ballet, a Grand pas, or Grand pas classique (French: [ɡʁɑ̃ pɑ]; literally meaning big or large classical step) is a suite of pure dance numbers that is devoid of dramatic action, serving strictly as the pièce de résistance in the context of a full-length ballet performance to showcase the talents of the principal dancers, demi-soloists, and occasionally the corps de ballet. The Grand pas traditionally consists of a combination of particular dances: an Entrée (introduction to the suite where the dancers make their entrance); a Grand adage (adagio of the lead ballerina, partnered by the lead male dancer and occasionally other partners); a dance for the corps de ballet can be included; variations (solo dances) for the lead dancers demi-soloists; and finally the Coda (or Grand coda) concludes the suite.

== Formats ==
The grand pas appears in a variety of formats and may employ varying numbers of dancers. For example, a grand pas de deux is performed by only two dancers; this typically serves as the pièce de résistance for the principal male and female characters of a full-length ballet. A grand pas for three soloists is a grand pas de trois, and for four soloists is a grand pas de quatre.

A Grand pas d'action is a grand pas that contributes to the ballet's story. A well-known example of this is the first act of The Sleeping Beauty, consisting of the Rose Adagio grand adage, Dance for the Maids of Honor and Pages, Princess Aurora variation, and coda which is abruptly interrupted by the evil fairy Carabosse, who gives Princess Aurora a poisoned spindle. This grand pas d'action tells an integral part of the story, with Princess Aurora choosing between four prospective princes and receiving a rose from each.

In a grand pas classique, classical ballet technique prevails and the piece itself does not carry the action of the ballet forward. A well-known example of such a piece is the grand pas created by Marius Petipa in 1881 for his revival of the ballet Paquita, known today as Paquita Grand Pas Classique.
