= Positions of the arms in ballet =

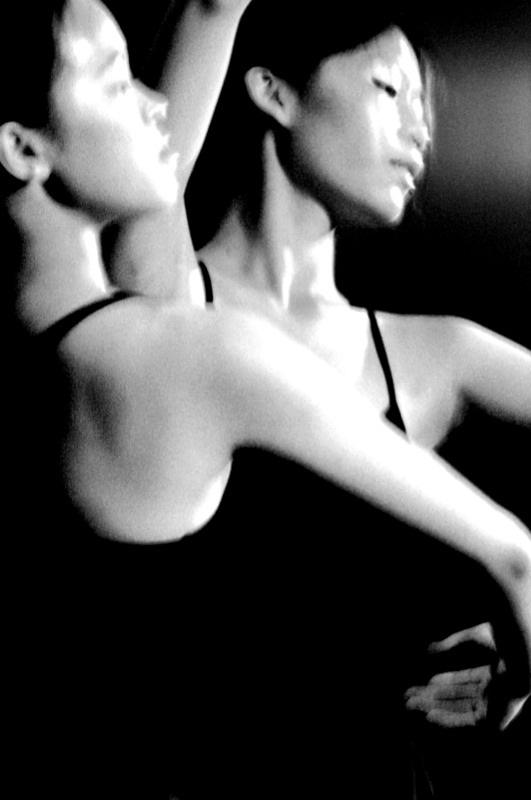
Arms in Cecchetti's "Spanish fourth" position

There are two basic positions of the arms in ballet. In one, the dancer keeps the fingers of both arms fully touching to form an oval shape, either almost touching the hips, or at navel level, or raised above the dancer's head. In the other, the arms are extended to the sides with the elbows slightly bent. These positions may be combined to give other positions.

Names differ according to the school/method followed, such as Vaganova, French, Royal Academy of Dance (RAD), Cecchetti, etc. of the arms; the corresponding allongés positions are obtained by stretching the elbows and rotating the palms of the hands downwards.

Vaganova or Russian school:

- Bras bas or preparatory position: both arms are down and rounded with both hands just in front of the hips, fingers almost touching.
- First position: maintaining the curved shape, arms are brought up so that the tips of the fingers are in line with the navel or no higher than the sternum.
- Second position: arms are out to the sides, angled down and forward, with palms facing forward. Elbows are slightly lower than the shoulders, and wrists are level with the elbow.
- Third position: arms are curved as in the first position and raised just above and slightly forward of the head.

Combinations of the basic arm positions are called:

- Petite pose: one arm is in the second position, the other is in the first position.
- Grande pose: one arm is in the second position, the other is in the third position.

These are used mainly in the center.

French school and Royal Academy of Dance:

- Bras bas or bras au repos: both arms are rounded with the fingers almost touching, both hands just in front of the hips.
- First position: maintaining this curved shape, arms are brought up so that the tips of the fingers are in line with the navel.
- Second position: arms are out to the sides, angled down and forward, with palms facing forward. Elbows are slightly lower than the shoulders, and wrists are slightly lower than the elbow.
- Third position: one arm is in the second position, the other is in the first position.
- Fourth crossed position: one arm is in the first position, the other is rounded and raised above the head.
- Fourth ordinary position: one arm is in the second position, the other is rounded and raised above the head.
- Fifth position or bras en couronne: both arms are rounded and held above and slightly forward of the head.

Cecchetti method:

- First position: both arms are slightly rounded with the fingers slightly away from the dancer's thighs (as if grazing above the tutu).
- Second position: arms are out to the sides with an angle down and forward, palms facing forward. The elbow is slightly lower than the shoulder, and the wrist is slightly lower than the elbow. A position intermediate between the first and the second position is called demi-seconde.
- Third position: one arm is in the first position, the other is in demi-seconde.
- Fourth position: there are two fourth positions; fourth en avant (in front): one arm is in second position, the other is in fifth en avant; fourth en haut (high): one arm is in second position, the other is in fifth position en haut.
- Fifth position: whenever the arms are rounded to form an oval, they are in fifth position. There is a fifth position en bas (down); en avant (forward - Russian and French first position); and en haut (high - Russian third position).

== See also ==
- Positions of the feet in ballet
