= Positions of the feet in ballet =

Part of classical ballet technique

The positions of the feet in ballet is a fundamental part of classical ballet technique that defines standard placements of feet on the floor. There are five basic positions in modern-day classical ballet, known as the first through fifth positions. In 1725, dancing master Pierre Rameau credited the codification of these five positions to choreographer Pierre Beauchamp. Two additional positions, known as the sixth and seventh positions, were codified by Serge Lifar in the 1930s while serving as Ballet Master at the Paris Opéra Ballet, though their use is limited to Lifar's choreographies. The sixth and seventh positions were not Lifar's inventions, but revivals of positions that already existed in the eighteenth century, when there were ten positions of the feet in classical ballet.

== Five basic positions ==
The first basic position requires the feet to be flat on the floor and turned out (pointing in opposite directions as a result of rotating the legs at the hips).

=== First position ===
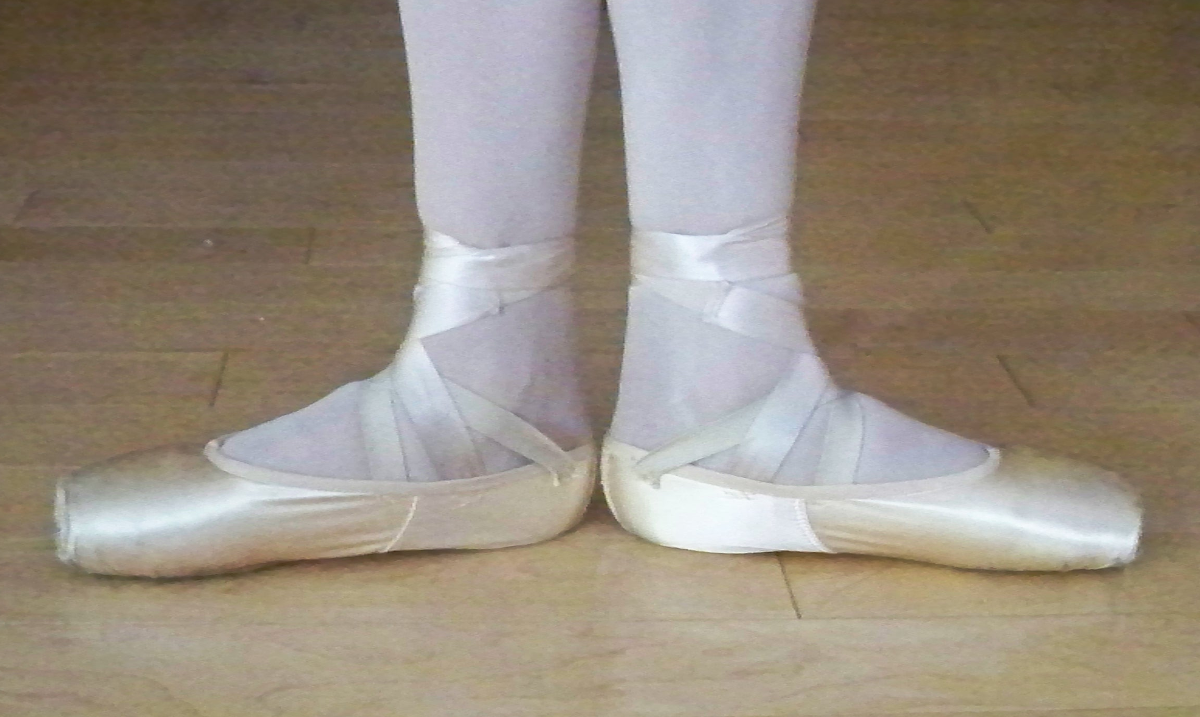
First position

Heels together, and toes going outwards.

=== Second position ===
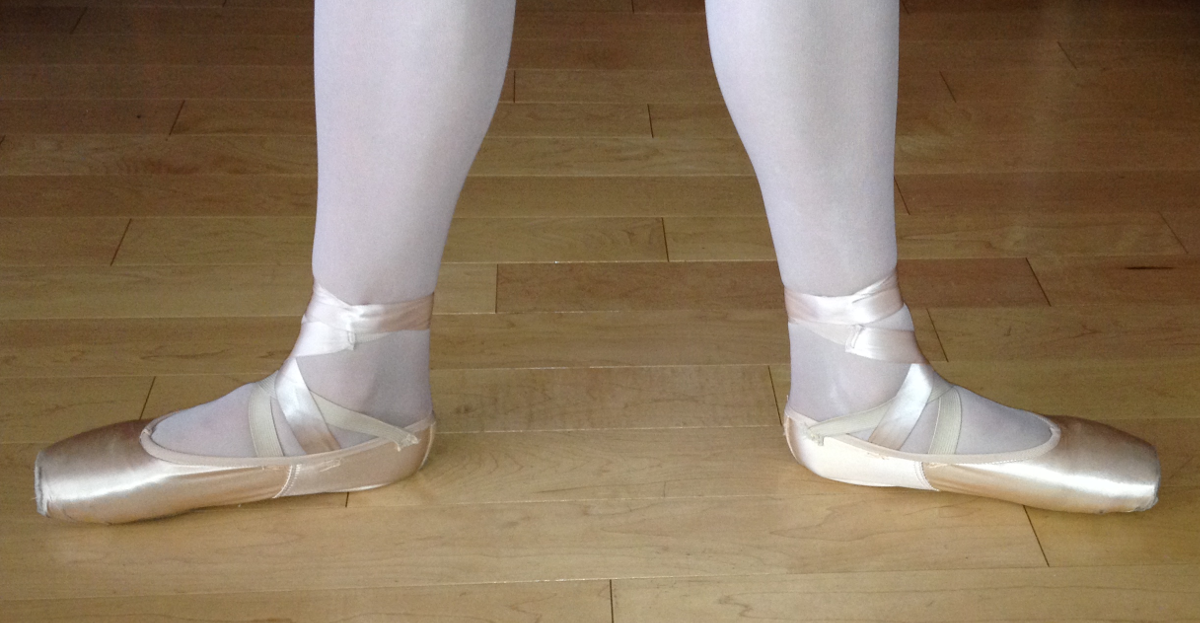
Second position

The feet point in opposite directions, with heels spaced approximately 12 inches (30 cm) apart

=== Third position ===
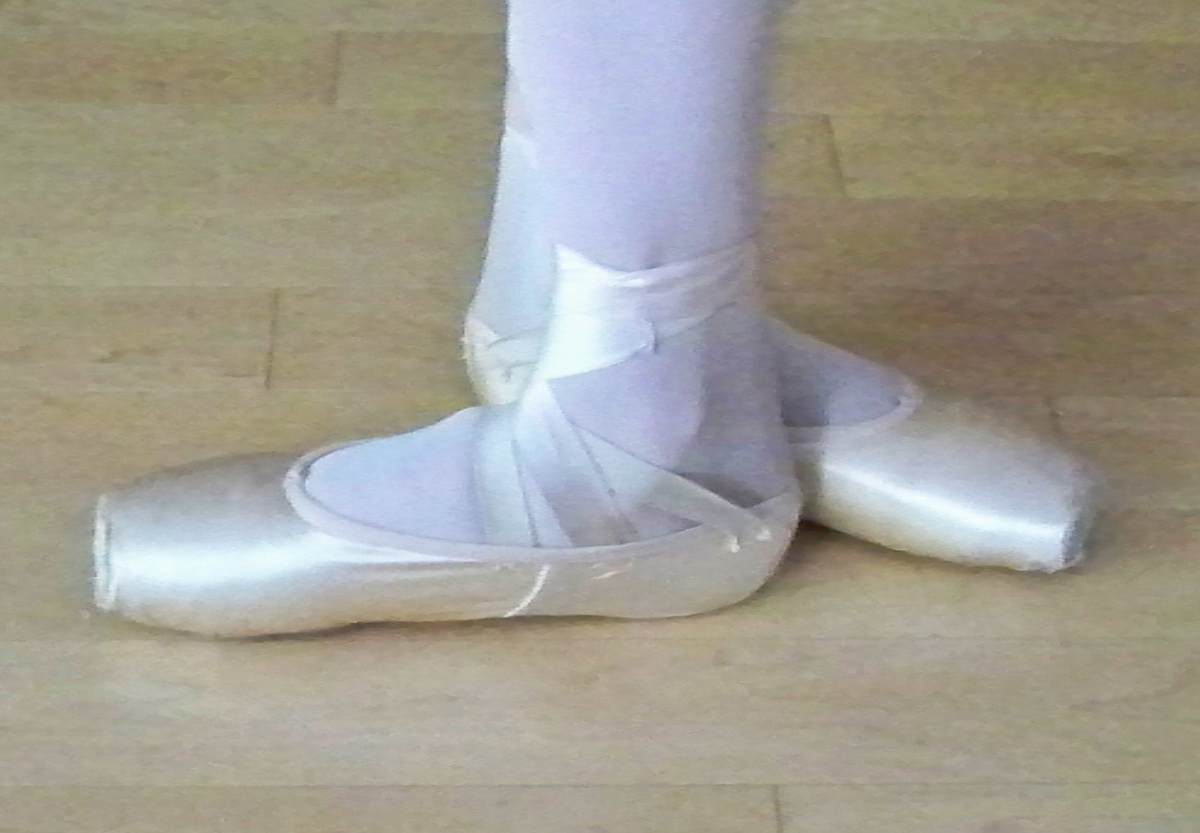
Third position

One foot is placed in front of the other so that the heel of the front foot is near the arch of the rear foot.

=== Fourth position ===
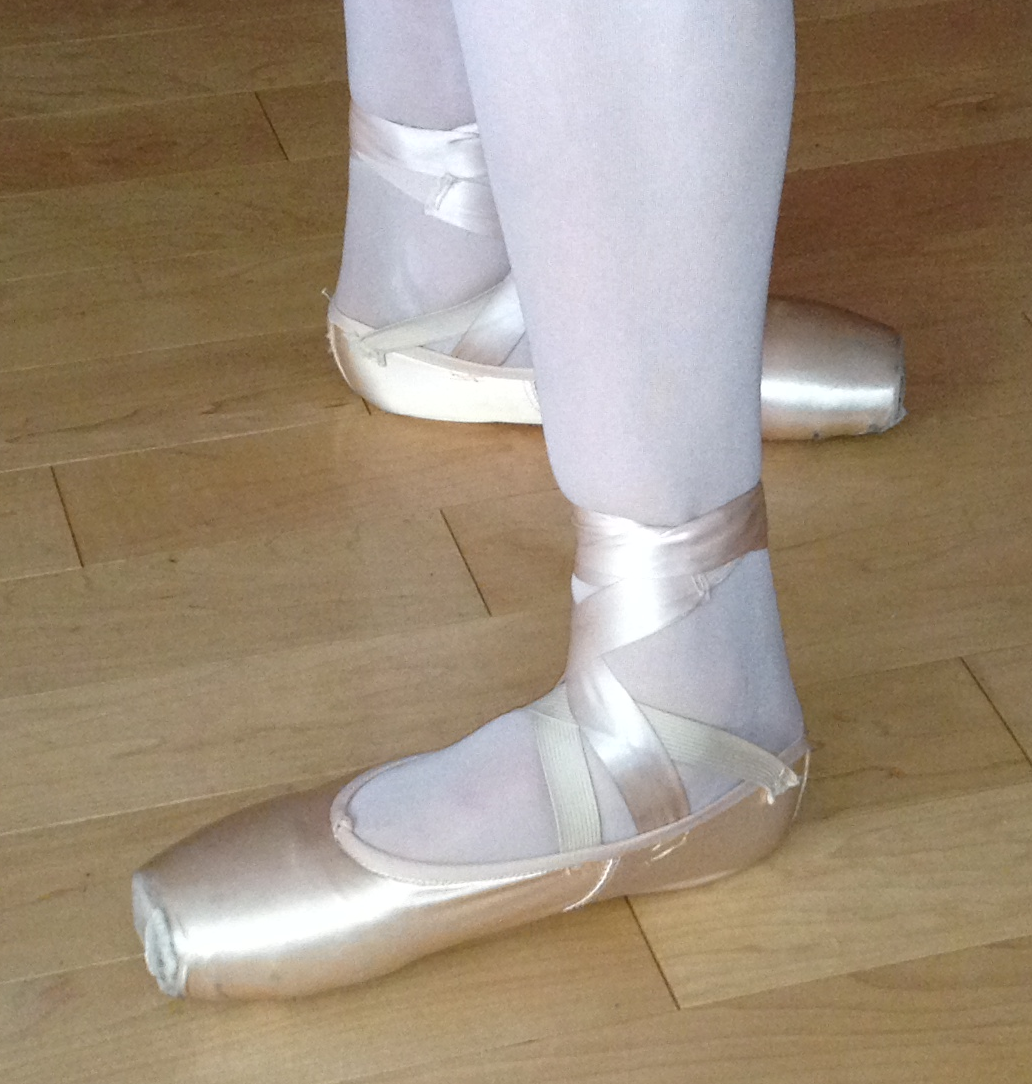
Open fourth position, with heels lined up, one directly in front of the other

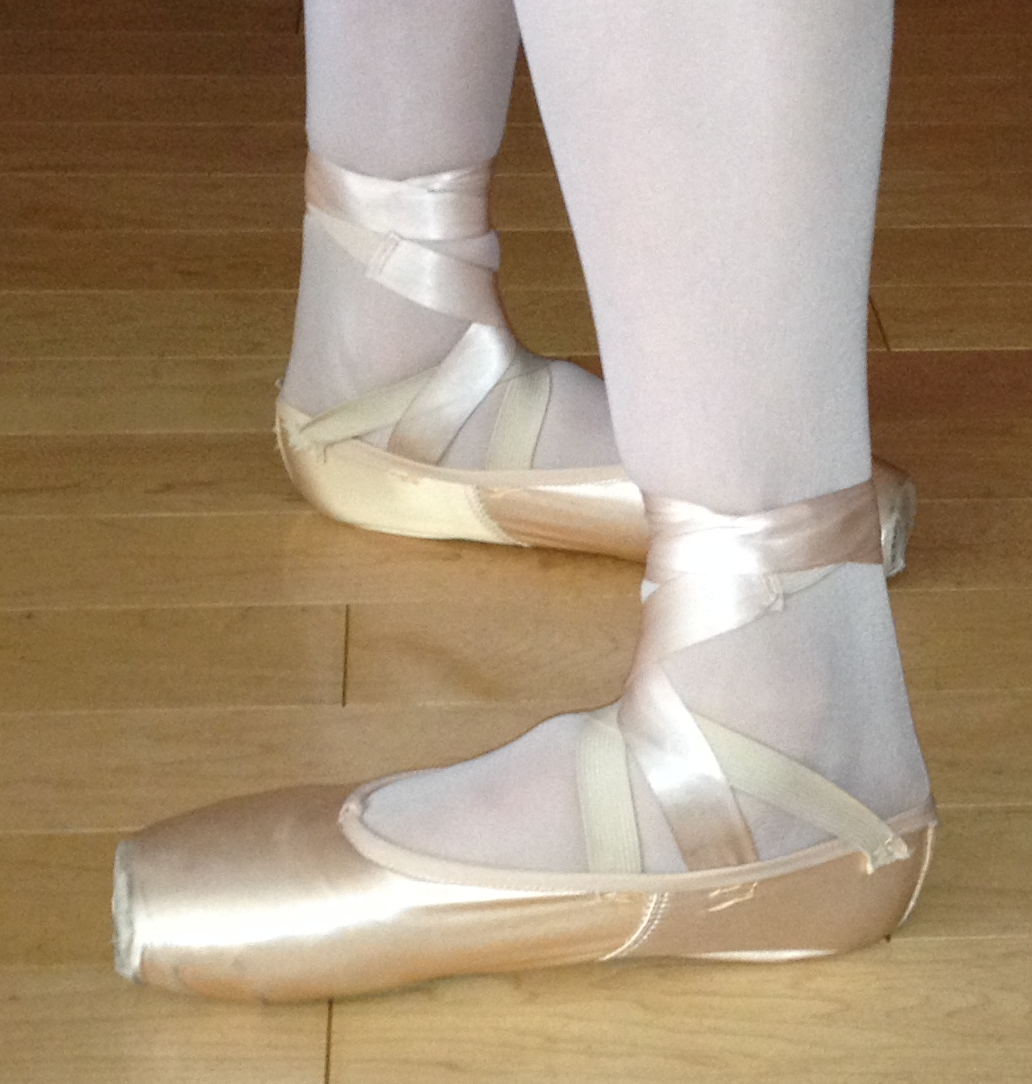
Closed fourth position, with heel of each foot overlapping the toe of the other foot

There are two types of fourth position: ouverte and croise. In both cases, one foot is placed approximately 12 inches (30 cm) in front of the other. In open fourth position the heels are aligned, while in closed fourth position the heel of the front foot is aligned with the toe of the back foot.

=== Fifth position ===
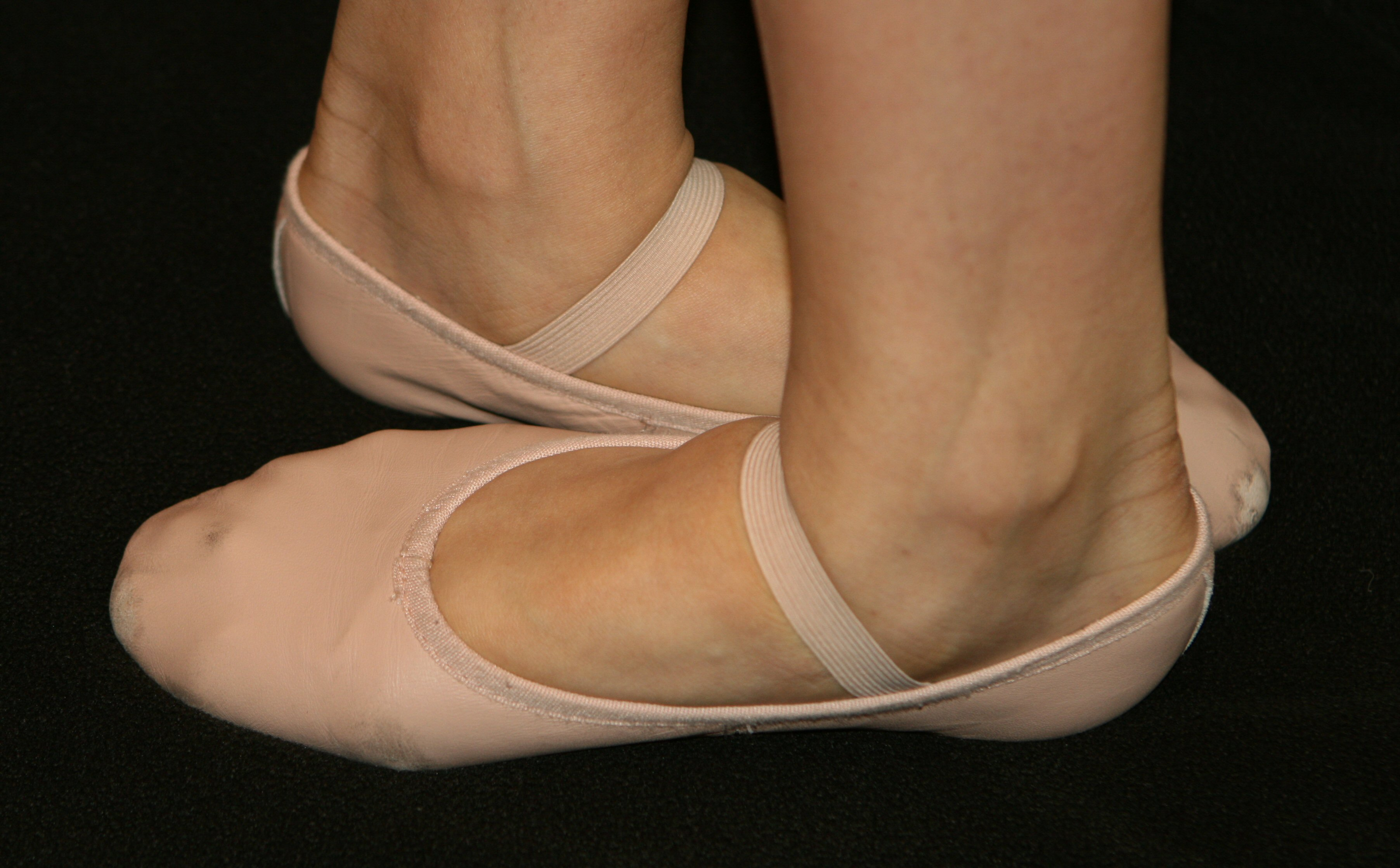
Fifth position

In fifth position, the feet are parallel, with the heel of the front foot in contact with the big toe of back foot, and the heel of the back foot in contact with the last toe of the front foot.

== Lifar's additional positions ==
Serge Lifar (1905–1986) codified two additional positions known as the sixth and seventh positions, with the feet turned in, not out like the first five positions.

=== Sixth position ===
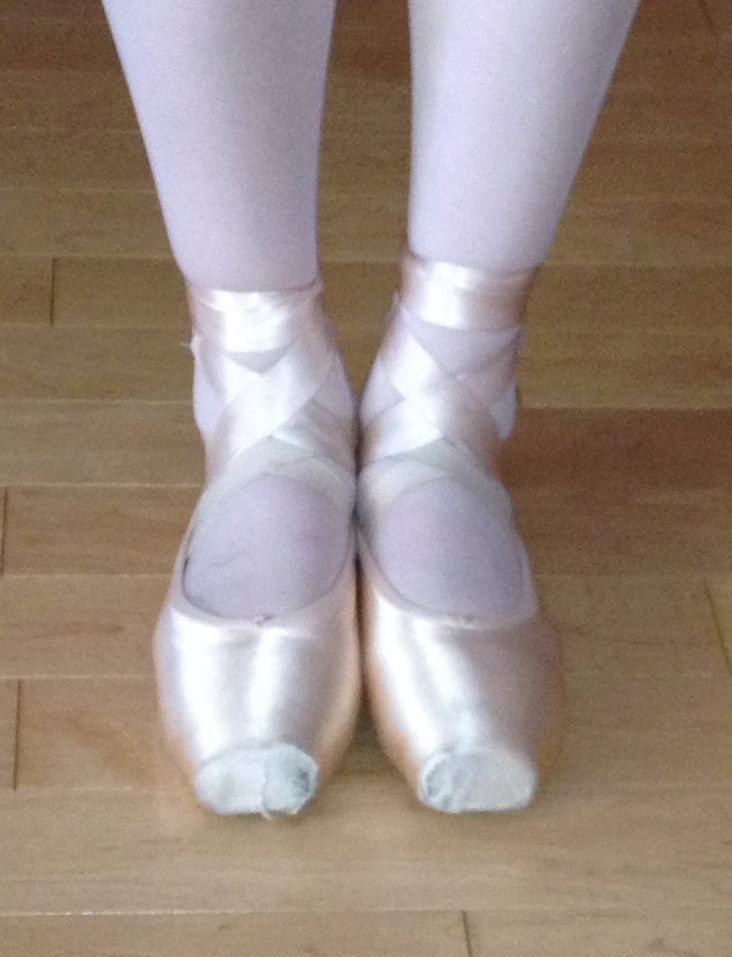
Sixth position

In Lifar's sixth position, the legs are turned in with the feet side-by-side and parallel.

=== Seventh position ===
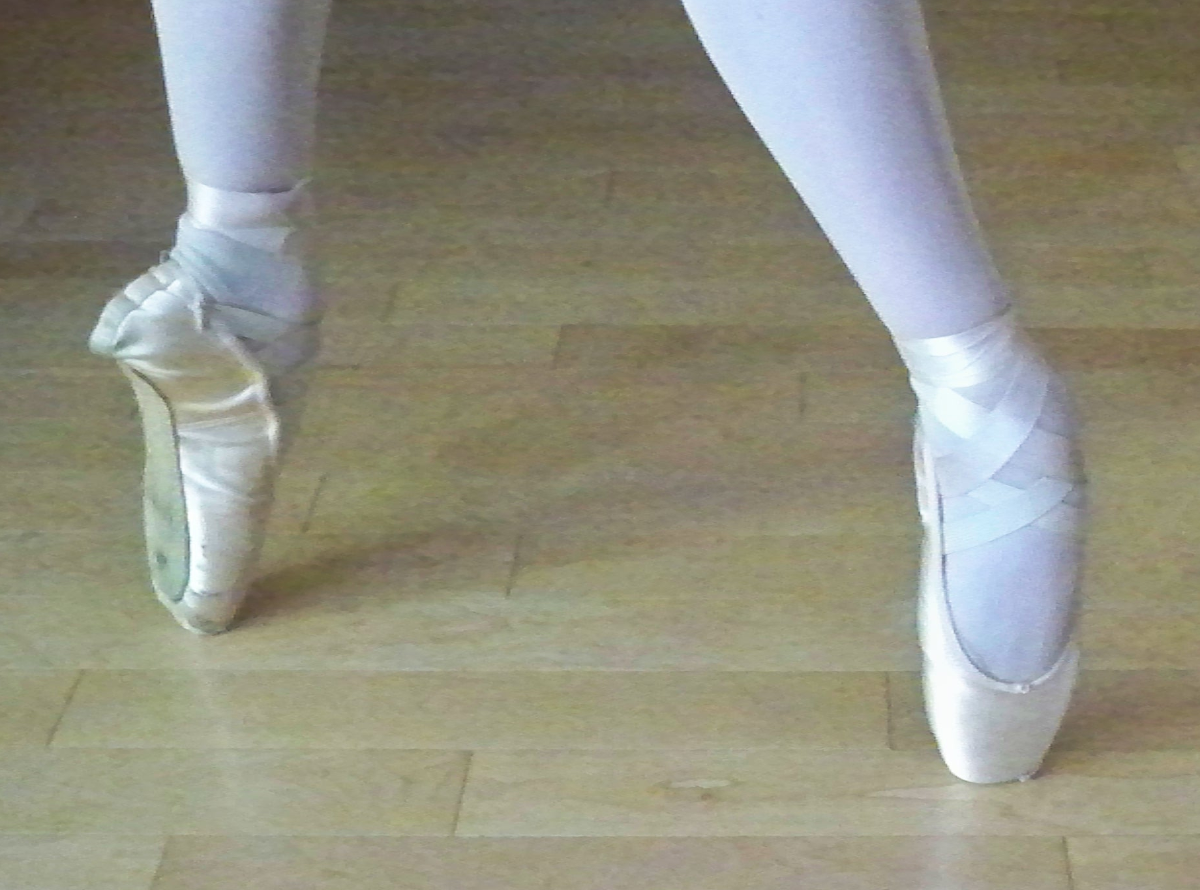
Seventh position

Similar to fourth position, but performed en pointe with heels in center with each other. There are two seventh positions, determined by whether the left or right foot is placed in front.

== See also ==
- Positions of the arms in ballet
