= Demi-soloist =

Rank and role in ballet

Demi-soloist can have one of two meanings in the ballet. The first is for a solo role normally danced by a member of the corps de ballet. Such roles are often made in pairs, that is, two corps dancers, dance together, frequently in mirror image. In most cases, it distinguishes dancers who mostly still dance with the corps de ballet, but will sometimes break away from the group to dance a more featured role.

Such dances are most commonly created for a pair of ballerinas but are occasionally made for (two or more) danseurs. Even more rare are ballets with dances for one, two, or more demi-soloist couples.

At a gala or other deluxe performance a company's soloists or principal dancers might dance demi roles. (Note: demi without the following soloist has additional meanings in ballet.)

The second meaning of demi-soloist is that of a rank in a ballet company, the English equivalent being second soloist. Such rank is more common in European companies, but the National Ballet of Canada has second soloists and Houston Ballet has demi-soloists. The Australian Ballet follows the French naming and calls their demi-soloist equivalents coryphées.
