= Antigravity (disambiguation) =

Anti-gravity is a force that opposes gravity.

Anti-gravity or antigravity may also refer to:

- The Anti-Gravity Room, a Canadian TV show
- Google Antigravity, an AI-assisted coding environment
- Antigravity A1, a Chinese 360 drone
- AntiGravity, Inc, an American performance troupe
- AntiGravity Fitness, an American fitness group
- Anti-Gravity (album), an album by the Blue Aeroplanes
- Anti-gravity lean
- Antigravity cat
