= Christopher Calvin Harrison =

American director, dancer, acrobat, and choreographer

Christopher Harrison
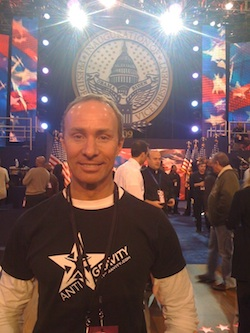
- Born: July 11, 1961 (age 64); Evanston, Illinois, United States
- Occupations: Choreographer, director, dancer, acrobat, fitness professional
- Years active: 1978-present
- Organization(s): AntiGravity, Inc, AntiGravity Fitness
- Notable work: AntiGravity's Crash Test Dummies, AntiGravity's An American Band
- Style: Acrobatics, Gymnastics, Aerial dance
- Website: www.anti-gravity.com

Christopher Calvin Harrison (born July 11, 1961) is an American director, dancer, acrobat, choreographer, fitness professional, and founder of performance troupe AntiGravity, Inc. and its spin-off fitness brand, AntiGravity Fitness.

Harrison began developing his movement style as a tumbling specialist and later as a dancer in Broadway theatre productions. In 1990, he established the performance company AntiGravity, composed of athletes, acrobats, and former Olympic competitors, with Harrison serving as director. They have been involved in various projects, including original theatrical productions, corporate events, and choreographing live performances, including the 2008 Neighborhood Inaugural Ball and the closing ceremonies of the 2002 Winter Olympics. AntiGravity has also collaborated with musicians and pop celebrities for performances in entertainment industry shows, including the Academy Awards, the MTV Video Music Awards, and the Grammys. Harrison continues to work as an aerial designer for Broadway shows and the Metropolitan Opera.

In 2007, Harrison developed and started AntiGravity Fitness, a brand of workout programs combining the silk hammocks used in AntiGravity's aerial performances with yoga practices, Pilates, ballet barre exercises, and traditional strength training techniques into different exercise curriculums. Headquartered in New York City at his development studio, Christopher Harrison's AntiGravity Lab, his programs are currently licensed in fitness centers in over 40 countries.

== Early career ==
Prior to his dance and theater career, Harrison was a competitive acrobat and tumbling specialist. When he was 17, he placed fourth in power tumbling at the World Games in Honolulu. However, citing that he did not have the body to reach the top ranks in competitive acrobatics, he enrolled at the University of Utah, took up competitive cheerleading, and switched focus to dance.

While 18 and still at the University of Utah, director Herbert Ross and choreographer Lynne Taylor-Corbett cast him as a featured dancer in the film Footloose after seeing him perform flips at the local drive-in.

After college, Harrison moved to New York City, where he went on to appear in multiple Broadway musicals, such as Cats, Damn Yankees, Meet Me in St. Louis, West Side Story, and A Chorus Line.

Harrison choreographed his first performance for the closing ceremonies celebration of the New York Marathon at the Roseland Ballroom. His group of acrobats were credited as "ZeroGravity," though Harrison changed the name to "AntiGravity" when they performed an annual feature in the Easter Show at the Radio City Music Hall.

He directed his first full-length acrobatic show for Club Med Resorts in 1991. For six years, the interdependence he established with the international resort company allowed his performers to attain access to rehearsal space, where he continued to develop the troupe's acrobatic style.

== Theater ==
=== Metropolitan Opera ===
Harrison has had a long-standing relationship with the Metropolitan Opera House in New York City. In 1992 he led the Opera's first in-house acrobatic troupe in 14 stage appearances, and in the following year, Harrison created acrobatic staging in a production of Berlioz's Les Troyens.

From 1995 to 1996, Harrison created staging for Un Ballo in Maschera, La Traviata, Salome, Turandot, and Pagliacci. In 1997, Harrison added acrobatic acts to Ariadne auf Naxos and La Damnation de Faust. During that time Harrison collaborated with many of the MET's notable figures, including Hal Prince and Franco Zeffirelli.

Since 1998, Harrison has consulted on acrobatic and aerial performances in multiple opera productions, including Aida, Samson et Delilah, and Manon.

=== Aerial choreography ===
Christopher Harrison has provided aerial choreography for multiple Broadway and theater productions, including the 1997 revival of Leonard Bernstein's Candide. In the original production of Swing!, which opened in December 1999, Harrison was credited for providing the show's "aerial flying" elements. Harrison also designed the aerial act for Jane Krakowski in the revival of Nine, for which he shared a Tony Award for Best Revival of a Musical.

In 1992, Harrison appeared with AntiGravity alongside Marisa Tomei in The Comedy of Errors at the Delacorte Theater for Shakespeare in the Park.

In the original production of Stephen Sondheim's The Frogs, Harrison collaborated with director Susan Stroman on aerial design and created an aerial bungee number for Nathan Lane.

== Television appearances ==
Christopher Harrison first appeared on television with AntiGravity during the 1991 Miss America Pageant in a segment called "Extreme Dance" by choreographer Scott Salmon. In the same year, Harrison choreographed a segment for the NBA All-Star Game half-time show, as well as a television special "NBA All-Star Stay in School Jam" with MC Hammer.

In addition to live performances, Harrison also choreographed television commercials for multiple companies, including BF Goodrich, Samsung, and branding agency Big Blue Dot.

1n 2002, Harrison and AntiGravity were featured on Fox's Good Day New York newscast, as well as ABC's Good Morning America. This was followed by a debut of the company on NBC's Today Show in 2003.

=== Awards shows ===
Harrison collaborated as choreographer with rapper/producer P. Diddy and rapper Busta Rhymes in a number featuring Usher and Pharrell for the 2002 MTV Video Awards.

In 2003, Harrison also worked with the music group No Doubt in a feature song presentation during the 45th Annual Grammy Awards, as well as working with Michael Jackson during the 2003 Radio Music Awards. For the BET Awards in 2007 and 2008 he choreographed performances featuring Nelly, Fergie, and 50 Cent.

In 2008, Harrison choreographed a Best Original Song performance for the 80th Academy Awards, based on choreography he directed for the 2007 film Enchanted.

== AntiGravity, Inc ==
On November 3, 1990, Christopher Harrison founded AntiGravity, Inc when organizers from the New York Marathon hired him to choreograph a performance for the Marathon's closing ceremonies at the Roseland Ballroom. Initially credited as "ZeroGravity," the performance troupe comprised athletes, acrobats, and former Olympic competitors, with Harrison serving as director and choreographer.

Later in 1991, Harrison changed the name to "AntiGravity" when they performed a feature for the Radio City Music Hall annual Easter Show. They have since performed in over 500 productions and live performances in over 25 countries, with teams in New York City, Las Vegas, Orlando, Toronto, and Ontario.

== AntiGravity Fitness ==
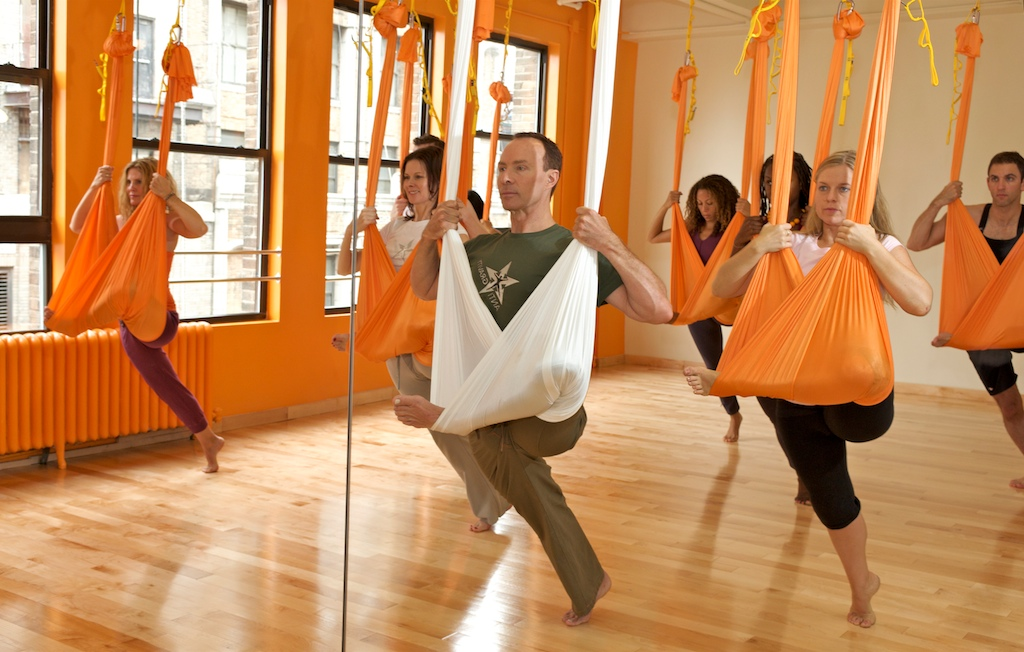
AntiGravity Aerial Yoga

In 2007, Harrison launched a fitness technique called AntiGravity Aerial Yoga, which he then licensed to various fitness centers, including Virgin Active Fitness in Milan, Steve Nash Fitness World in Vancouver, British Columbia, Madonna's Hard Candy Fitness in Moscow, and Crunch Fitness gyms throughout the US. Since the launch of the initial technique, Harrison has combined yoga practices, Pilates, ballet barre exercises, and strength training techniques into multiple exercise curriculums under the brand AntiGravity Fitness.

== Personal life ==
Harrison's personal struggle with the tenets of the Church of Jesus Christ of Latter-Day Saints pertaining to homosexuality, greatly influenced his outlook on life. Harrison's approach to athleticism, a fascination with flight, and an attitude against graveness called "Be AIRful" culminates in an overall outlook he calls the AntiGravity philosophy.

== See also ==
- AntiGravity, Inc
- AntiGravity Fitness
