= Doves as symbols =

Symbology pertaining to doves

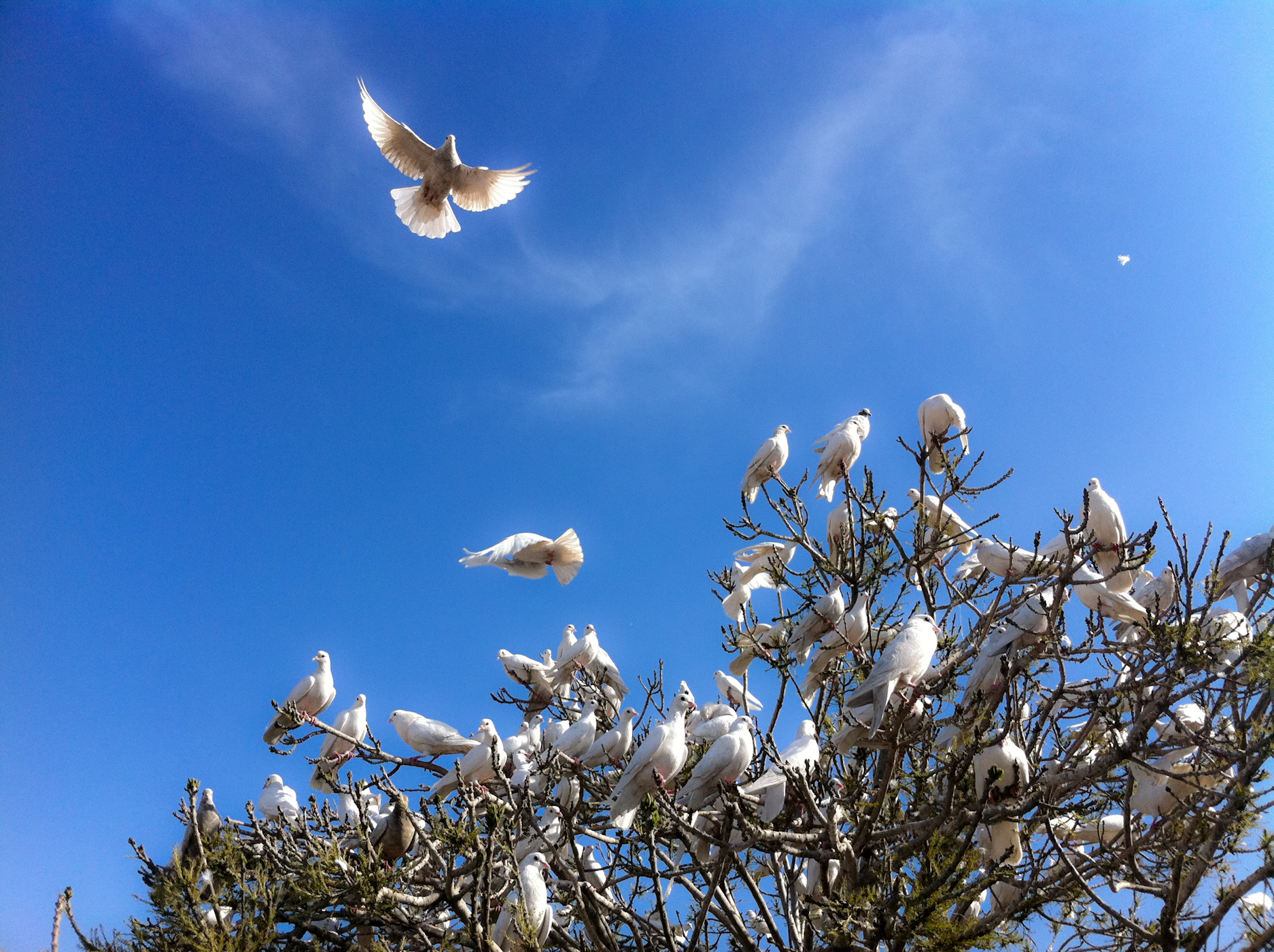
White doves at the Blue Mosque, Mazar-i-Sharif

Doves, typically domestic pigeons white in plumage, are used in many settings as symbols of peace, freedom, or love. Doves appear in the symbolism of Judaism, Christianity, Islam and paganism, and pacifist groups.

== Ancient religions ==
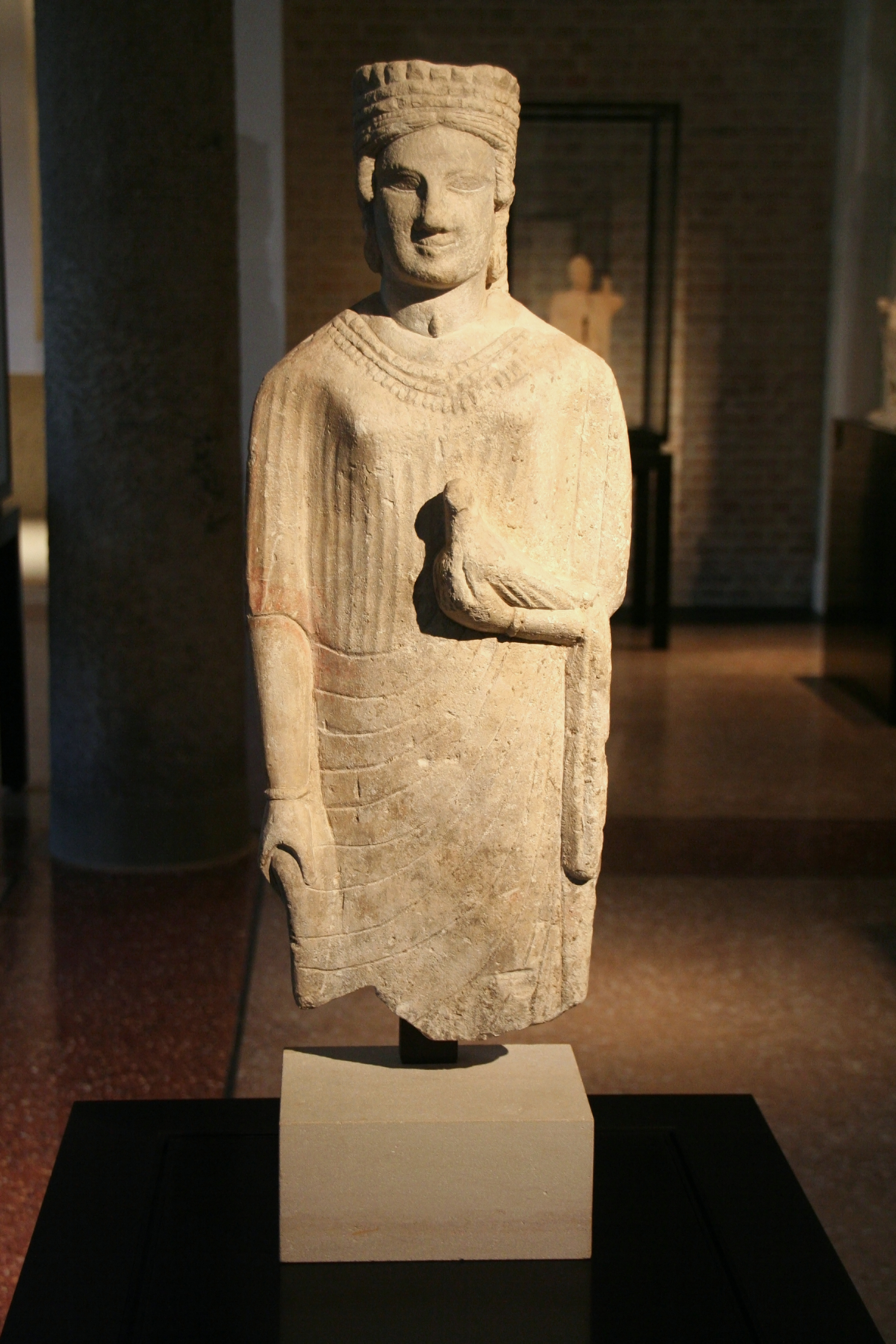
Early fifth-century BC statue of Aphrodite from Cyprus, showing her wearing a cylinder crown and holding a dove

In ancient Mesopotamia, doves were prominent animal symbols of Inanna-Ishtar, the goddess of love, sexuality, and war. Doves are shown on cultic objects associated with Inanna as early as the beginning of the third millennium BC. Lead dove figurines were discovered in the temple of Ishtar at Aššur, dating to the thirteenth century BC, and a painted fresco from Mari, Syria shows a giant dove emerging from a palm tree in the temple of Ishtar, indicating that the goddess herself was sometimes believed to take the form of a dove. In the Epic of Gilgamesh, Utnapishtim releases a dove and a raven to find land; the dove merely circles and returns. Only then does Utnapishtim send forth the raven, which does not return, and Utnapishtim concludes the raven has found land.

In the ancient Levant, doves were used as symbols for the Canaanite mother goddess Asherah.

The ancient Greek word for "dove" was peristerá, which may be derived from the Semitic phrase peraḥ Ištar, meaning "bird of Ishtar". In classical antiquity, doves were sacred to the Greek goddess Aphrodite, who absorbed this association with doves from Inanna-Ishtar. Aphrodite frequently appears with doves in ancient Greek pottery. The temple of Aphrodite Pandemos on the southwest slope of the Athenian Acropolis was decorated with relief sculptures of doves with knotted fillets in their beaks and votive offerings of small, white, marble doves were discovered in the temple of Aphrodite at Daphni. During Aphrodite's main festival, the Aphrodisia, her altars would be purified with the blood of a sacrificed dove. Aphrodite's associations with doves influenced the Roman goddesses Venus and Fortuna, causing them to become associated with doves as well.

In the Japanese mythology, doves are Hachiman's familiar spirit. Hachiman is the syncretic divinity of archery and war incorporating elements from both Shinto and Buddhism.

== Abrahamic religions ==
=== Judaism ===
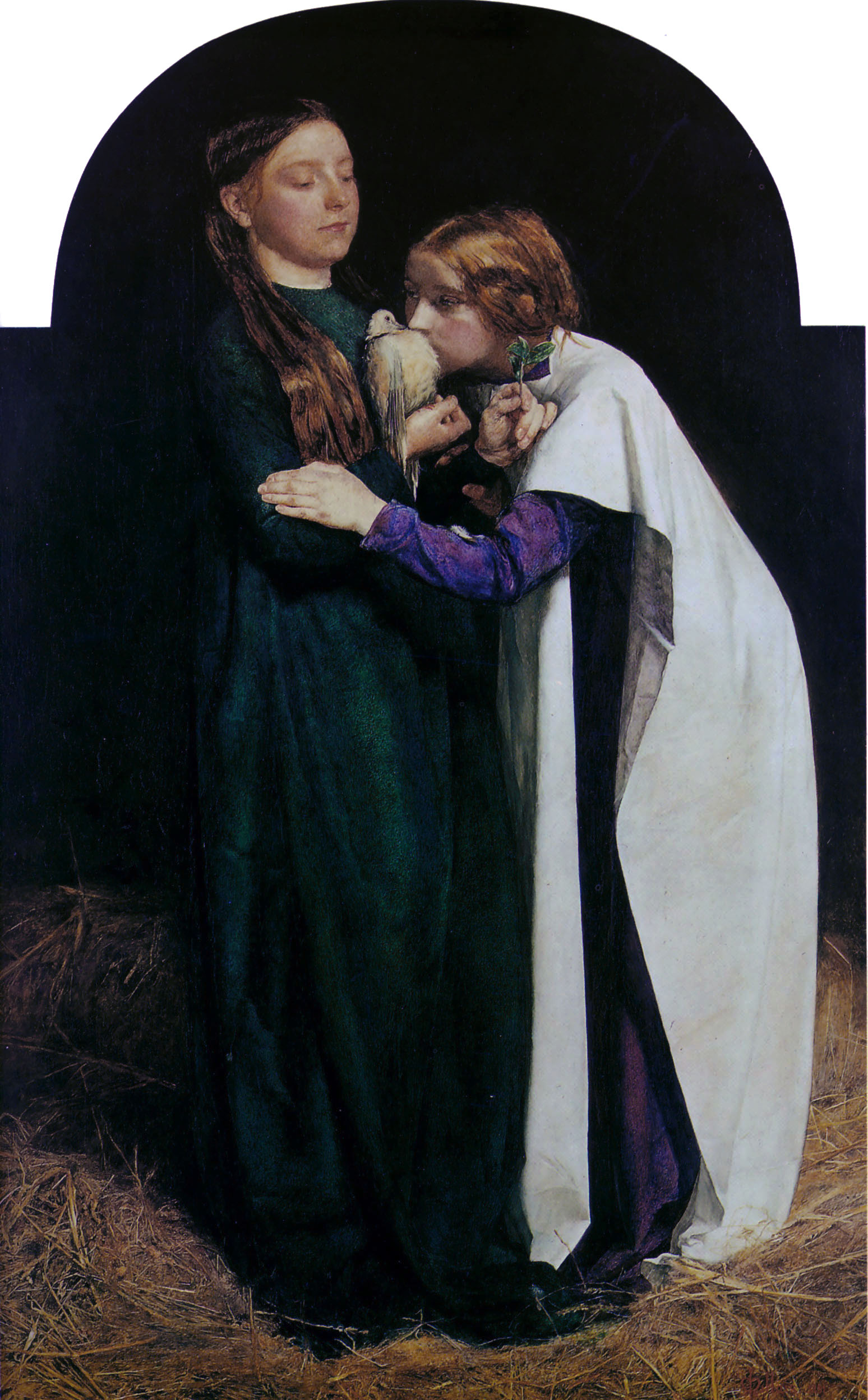
J. E. Millais: The Return of the Dove to the Ark (1851)

According to the biblical story (Genesis 8:11), a dove was released by Noah after the Flood in order to find land; it came back carrying a freshly plucked olive leaf (Hebrew: עלה זית alay zayit), a sign of life after the Flood and of God's bringing Noah, his family and the animals to land. Rabbinic literature interpreted the olive leaf as "the young shoots of the Land of Israel" or the dove's preference for bitter food in God's service, rather than sweet food in the service of men.

The Talmud compares the spirit of God hovering over the waters to a dove that hovers over her young.

In post-biblical Judaism, souls are envisioned as bird-like (Bahir 119), a concept that may be derived from the Biblical notion that dead spirits "chirp" (Isa. 29:4). The Guf, or Treasury of Souls, is sometimes described as a columbarium, a dove cote. This connects it to a related legend: the "Palace of the Bird's Nest", the dwelling place of the Messiah's soul until his advent (Zohar II: 8a–9a). The Vilna Gaon explicitly declares that a dove is a symbol of the human soul (Commentary to Jonah, 1). The dove is also a symbol of the people Israel (Song of Songs Rabbah 2:14), an image frequently repeated in Midrash.

=== Christianity ===
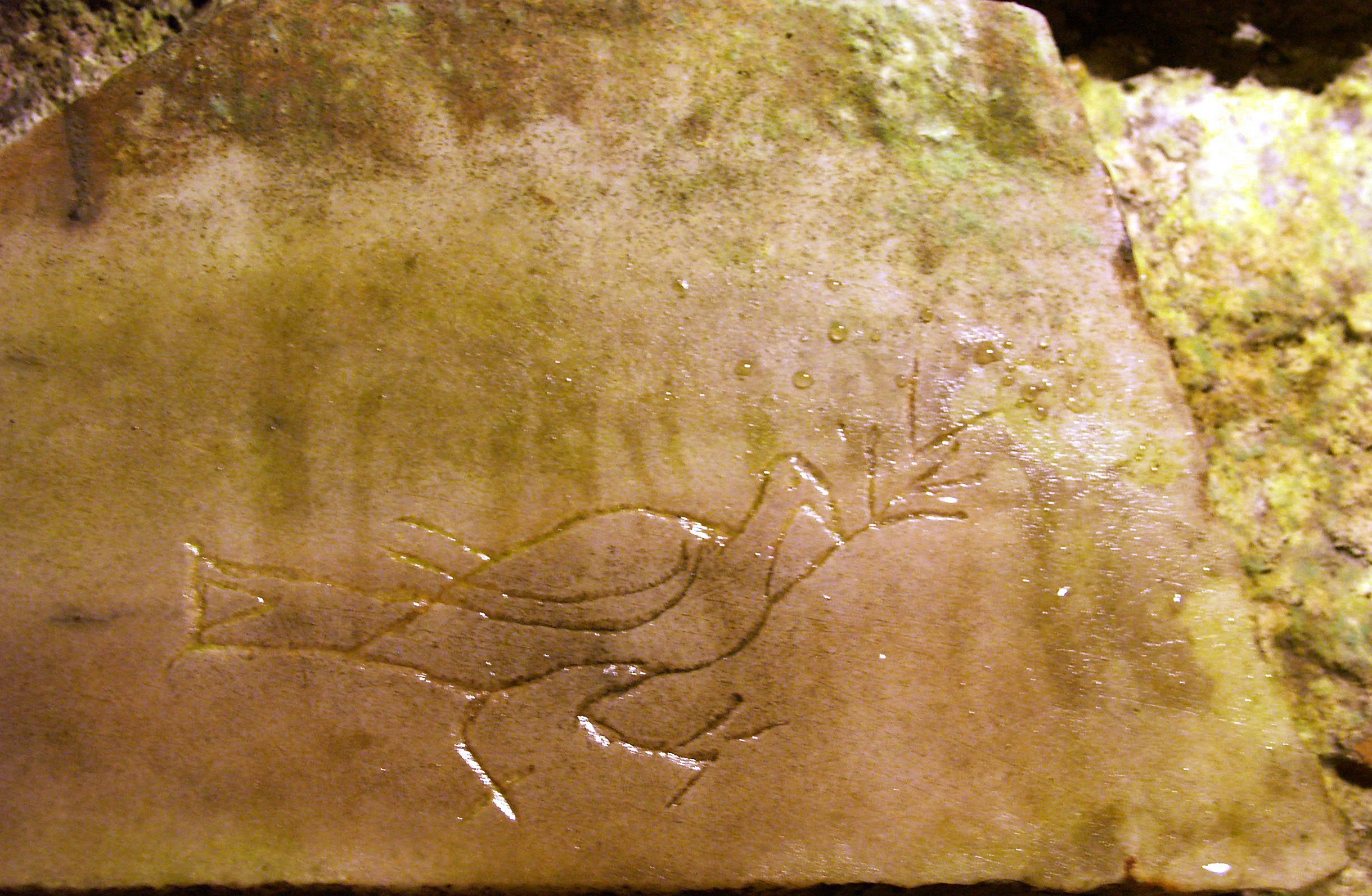
Dove with an olive branch, Catacombs of Domitilla, Rome

The symbolism of the dove in Christianity is first found in the Old Testament Book of Genesis in the story of Noah's Ark, "And the dove came in to him at eventide; and, lo, in her mouth an olive-leaf plucked off: so Noah knew that the waters were abated from off the earth". Genesis 8:11 And, also, in the New Testament Gospels of Matthew and Luke, both passages describe after the baptism of Jesus, respectively, as follows, "And Jesus when he was baptized, went up straightway from the water: and lo, the heavens were opened unto him, and he saw the Spirit of God descending as a dove, and coming upon him". Matthew 3:16 and, "And the Holy Spirit descended on him in bodily form like a dove. And a voice came from heaven: "You are my Son, whom I love; with you I am well pleased". Luke 3:22 The Holy Spirit descending on Jesus and appearing in the bodily form of a dove is mentioned in the other two Gospels as well (see Mark 1:10 and John 1:32).

Jesus's parents sacrificed doves on his behalf after his circumcision (Luke 2:24). Later, the Holy Spirit descended upon Jesus at his baptism like a dove (Matthew), and subsequently the "peace dove" became a common Christian symbol of the Holy Spirit.

White dove with olive branch pictured in the coat of arms of the Diocese of Tampere

In Hebrew, Jonah (יוֹנָה) means dove. The "sign of Jonas" in Matthew 16 is related to the "sign of the dove".

The use of a dove and olive branch as a symbol of peace originated with the early Christians, who portrayed the act of baptism accompanied by a dove holding an olive branch in its beak and also used the image on their sepulchres.

Christians derived the symbol of the dove and olive branch from Greek thought, including its use of the symbol of the olive branch, and the story of Noah and the Flood. Although Jews never used the dove as a symbol of peace, it acquired that meaning among early Christians, confirmed by St Augustine of Hippo in his book On Christian Doctrine and became well established.

In Christian Iconography, a dove also symbolizes the Holy Spirit, in reference to Matthew 3:16 and Luke 3:22 where the Holy Spirit is compared to a dove at the Baptism of Jesus.

The early Christians in Rome incorporated into their funerary art the image of a dove carrying an olive branch, often accompanied by the word "Peace". It seems that they derived this image from the simile in the Gospels, combining it with the symbol of the olive branch, which had been used to represent peace by the Greeks and Romans. The dove and olive branch also appeared in Christian images of Noah's ark. The fourth century Vulgate translated the Hebrew alay zayit (leaf of olive) in Genesis 8:11 as Latin ramum olivae (branch of olive). By the fifth century, Augustine of Hippo wrote in On Christian Doctrine that "perpetual peace is indicated by the olive branch (oleae ramusculo) which the dove brought with it when it returned to the ark".

In the Hebrew Bible, doves or young pigeons are acceptable burnt offerings for those who cannot afford a more expensive animal.

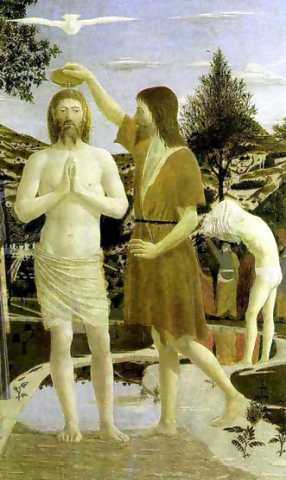
Baptism of Christ, by Francesca, 1449

In the earliest Christian art, the dove represented the peace of the soul rather than civil peace, but from the third century it began to appear in depictions of conflict in the Old Testament, such as Noah and the Ark, and in the Apocrypha, such as Daniel and the lions, the three young men in the furnace, and Susannah and the Elders.

Before the Peace of Constantine (313 AD), in which Rome ceased its persecution of Christians following Constantine's conversion, Noah was normally shown in an attitude of prayer, a dove with an olive branch flying toward him or alighting on his outstretched hand. According to Graydon Snyder, "The Noah story afforded the early Christian community an opportunity to express piety and peace in a vessel that withstood the threatening environment" of Roman persecution. According to Ludwig Budde and Pierre Prigent, the dove referred to the descent of the Holy Spirit rather than the peace associated with Noah. After the Peace of Constantine, when persecution ceased, Noah appeared less frequently in Christian art.

Medieval illuminated manuscripts, such as the Holkham Bible, showed the dove returning to Noah with a branch. Wycliffe's Bible, which translated the Vulgate into English in the 14th century, uses "a braunche of olyue tre with greene leeuys" ("a branch of olive tree with green leaves") in Gen. 8:11. In the Middle Ages, some Jewish illuminated manuscripts also showed Noah's dove with an olive branch, for example, the Golden Haggadah (about 1420).

=== Mandaeism ===
In Mandaeism, white doves, known as ba in Mandaic, symbolize the spirit (ruha in Mandaic). Sacrifices of white doves are also performed during some Mandaean rituals such as the Ṭabahata Masiqta.

=== Islam ===
Doves and the pigeon family in general are respected and favoured because they are believed to have assisted the final Prophet of Islam, Muhammad, in distracting his pursuers outside the cave of Thaw'r, in the great Hijra. As the Prophet took refuge within the cave, a pair of pigeons and a spider were sent to settle at the entrance of the cave; the spider creating a web and the pigeons creating a nest that they laid eggs in. Thus, the Prophet's pursuers assumed that, as both animals would not have settled there if there were any disturbances, the Prophet and his companion Abu Bakr could not have entered the cave and taken refuge there, sparing them from capture.

== Peace and pacifism in politics ==
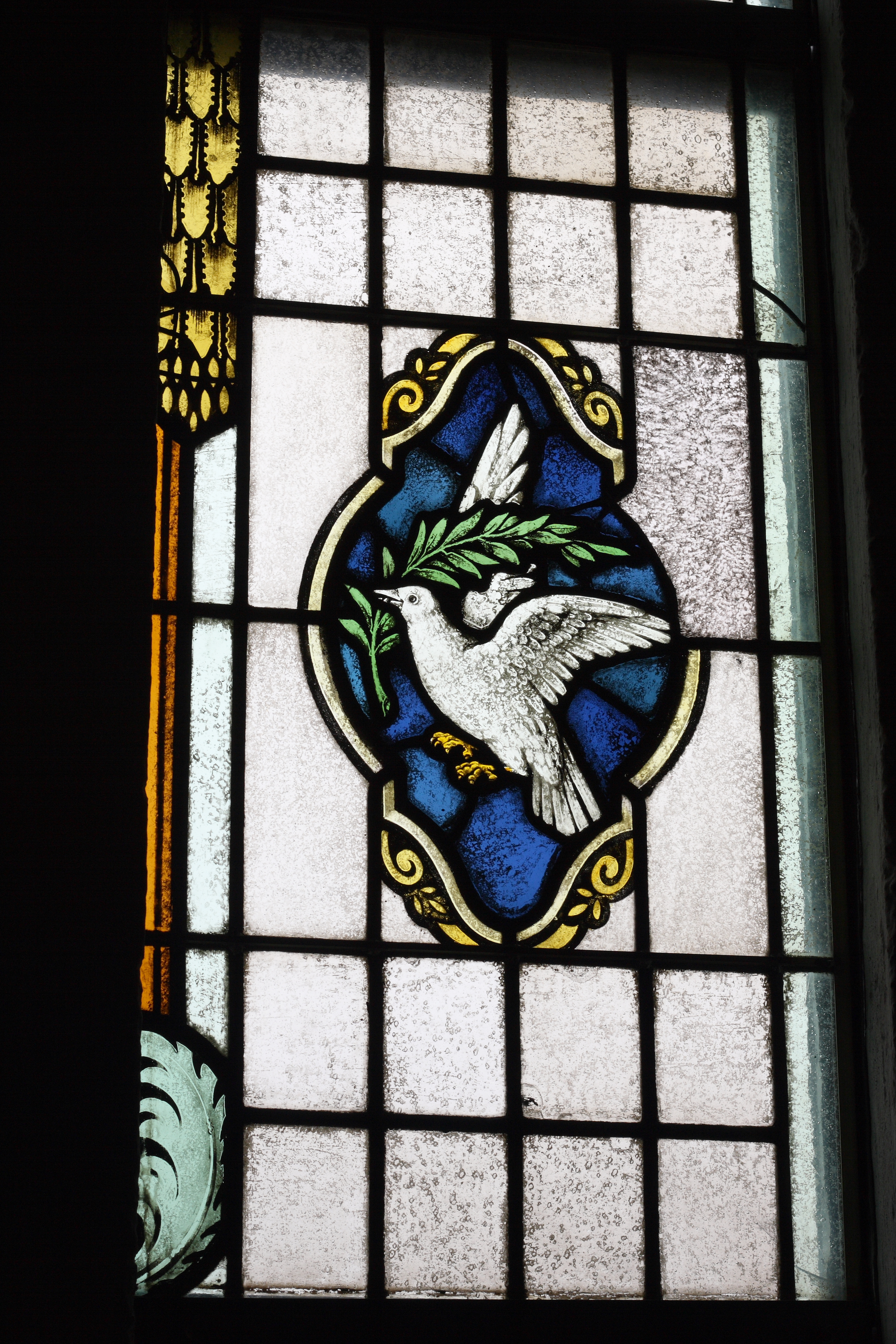
White dove with olive branch, stained glass window in the Denis and Saint Sebastian church in Kruft, Germany

Doves are often associated with the concept of peace and pacifism. They often appear in political cartoons, on banners and signs at events promoting peace (such as the Olympic Games, at various anti-war/anti-violence protests, etc.), and in pacifist literature. A person who is a pacifist is sometimes referred to as a dove (similarly, in American politics, a person who advocates the use of military resources as opposed to diplomacy can be referred to as a hawk). Monetary doves are individuals who prioritize low unemployment over low inflation, with respect to monetary policy.

Picasso's lithograph, La Colombe (The Dove), a traditional, realistic picture of a pigeon, without an olive branch, was chosen as the emblem for the World Peace Council in Paris in April 1949. At the 1950 World Peace Congress in Sheffield, Picasso said that his father had taught him to paint doves, concluding, "I stand for life against death; I stand for peace against war." At the 1952 World Peace Congress in Berlin, Picasso's Dove was depicted in a banner above the stage. Anti-communists had their own take on the peace dove: the group Paix et Liberté distributed posters titled La colombe qui fait BOUM (the dove that goes BOOM), showing the peace dove metamorphosing into a Soviet tank.

== Royal Air Force ==
Tactical Communications Wing RAF

The rock dove, due to its relation to the homing pigeon and thus communications, is the main image in the crest of the Tactical Communications Wing, a body within the Royal Air Force.

== Pigeon statues in Wellington ==
There are several bronze pigeon sculptures distributed around Wellington, New Zealand. They were designed by artist Jonathan Campbell and are placed around local businesses, each posed interacting with an object relating to the business. Ten of these sculptures were designed, and as of April 2024 two are missing.

== List of monuments depicting pigeons ==
There are many public monuments around the world devoted to and depicting pigeons.

Name	Location	Year dedicated	Information	Image
Passenger Pigeon Monument	Wyalusing State Park, Wisconsin	1948	The plaque on this conservationist statue's inscription reads: "Dedicated to the last passenger pigeon shot at Babcock, Sept. 1899. This species became extinct through the avarice and thoughtlessness of man." It honors the passenger pigeon, which had once perhaps been the most numerous bird on the planet before going extinct in 1914, largely due to unregulated hunting and habitat destruction committed by European settlers of North America.	
Monument voor de Oorlogsduif	Brussels, Belgium	1931	This metal statue, designed by Georges Hano and sculpted by Victor Voets, honors the war pigeons who died in World War I. Then-Brussels Mayor Adolphe Max at the 1931 dedication ceremony of this statue said that carrier pigeons perhaps made the greatest and most painful contribution to the victory and liberation of Belgium during the First World War. The metal statue depicts a pigeon landing on a topless woman's outstretched arm.	
Monument to Carrier Pigeons	Lille, France	1936	This stone monument depicts a woman flocked by birds, erected in honor of the approximately tens of thousands of birds who served as carrier pigeons or otherwise served the Triple Entente during World War I. The statue is in front of the Lille Zoo. It was erected by the édération Nationale des Sociétés Colombophiles (National Federation of Pigeon Societies).	
Hato Poppo monument	Tokyo, Japan	1962	This is one of multiple statues dedicated to the beloved Japanese children's song, "Hato Poppo". The words of the song were written by Kume Higashi while watching children play with pigeons at the Buddhist Sensō-ji temple in Tokyo, near where this statue now is. A plaque on the monument includes the musical notation of the song. Atop the monument, five bronze pigeons are perched.	
Monument au Pigeon-Soldat	Charleroi, Belgium	1951	A depiction of a bird with outstretched wings honors the pigeon soldiers of World War I. The sculptor was Alphonse Darville.	
Passenger Pigeon Memorial Hut	Cincinnati Zoo and Botanical Garden, Ohio		A memorial specifically to Martha, the last known passenger pigeon who died at the Cincinnati Zoo in 1914, is housed in a Japanese pagoda-style building on zoo's grounds. Inside the building is artwork depicting the passenger pigeon. A bronze Martha is outside the memorial.	

== See also ==
- Nonviolence
- Peace symbols
- Kapotasana and Rajakapotasana – yoga poses named after pigeons
