= AntiGravity, Inc =

American performance troupe

AntiGravity, Inc.
- Type: Private
- Industry: Entertainment
- Founded: 1990
- Founder: Christopher Harrison
- Headquarters: New York, New York
- Products: AntiGravity Aerial Yoga
- Divisions: AntiGravity Entertainment, AntiGravity Fitness
- Website: www.anti-gravity.com

AntiGravity, Inc. is a performance troupe and entertainment brand based in New York City and founded by Christopher Harrison. They have performed in over 500 productions in over 25 countries, with teams in New York City, Las Vegas, Orlando, Toronto, and Ontario.

== Company history ==
AntiGravity Inc. was founded on November 3, 1990, when organizers from the New York Marathon hired choreographer Christopher Harrison to put on a performance for the Marathon’s closing ceremonies at the Roseland Ballroom. Initially credited as “ZeroGravity,” the performance troupe comprised athletes, acrobats, and former Olympic competitors, with Harrison serving as director and choreographer.

Later in 1991, Harrison changed the name to “AntiGravity” when they performed a feature for the Radio City Music Hall annual Easter Show.

== Corporate events ==
In addition to theatrical and televised performances, AntiGravity put on several invitation-only showcases for corporations and fashion labels throughout the 1990s and early 2000s.

From 1996 to 2000, the company performed for Sony Entertainment, Condé Nast Publications, DeBeers, Aveda, Canon, Johnson & Johnson, Mercedes-Benz, Motorola, Samsung, Coldwell Banker, Avaya, Nortel, Chrysler, Forbes, Mitsubishi, Toyota, Target, Merrill Lynch, Oldsmobile, D’Agostinos, and Footlocker.

Technology companies, like Sun Microsystems, Comdex, Nokomis, Lotus Notes, Compaq, and IBM, were drawn to the brand’s high-energy style. In 2000, AntiGravity was selected to perform for the 20th Anniversary celebration of Microsoft. They performed for Bill Gates again in 2007 and at the Microsoft Dynamics Convergence in 2008.

By 2000, AntiGravity, which had until then only performed acrobatic moves on the ground, began to incorporate aerial techniques using silk fabric able to hold human body weight.

From 2001 to 2007, AntiGravity organized aerial performances for Jeep, McNeil, Redken, NASDAQ, Unilever, NYSE, Xerox, AT&T, Equinox Fitness, Mazda, PepsiCo, Samuel Adams, WonderBra, Henri Bendel, FedEx, Kohler, Gillette, Smirnoff, Daimler AG, Omnitel, AT&T, Standard & Poors, Walmart, Sterling Jewelers, and Sara Lee.

With the company’s transition to fitness branding in 2007, Christopher Harrison began turning AntiGravity's attention away from the corporate sector, opting for select performances throughout the year. From 2008 to 2011, AntiGravity performed for Lexus, Louis Vuitton, Hewlett-Packard, Deloitte, UTV Ignition Entertainment, IBM, and Heineken.

They have also performed for multiple notable figures, including George Soros, Giorgio Armani, George Lucas, and Richard Branson.

== Theatrical productions ==
AntiGravity performed their first full-scale theatrical show, called Circus Diva, at the Roseland Ballroom in March 1998. The show was marketed as a celebration of sexual diversity.

In 2001, Harrison produced, choreographed, and directed AntiGravity’s Crash Test Dummies, a full-length acrobatic performance about reject crash test dummies at an “Extreme Product Testing Center” and a janitor who falls in love with one of the dummies as she is about to go into the recycling bin.

In 2002, Harrison created a benefit performance following the September 11th terrorist attacks called AntiGravity: An American Band. The show was Harrison’s personal tribute to New York City.

In July 2007, Harrison produced and created AntiGravity: The Tour at the Hammerstein Ballroom. The show ran in venues across the US, and in 2010, Harrison revived AntiGravity: The Tour in a partnership with Banco Santander. The show performed in six cities in Brazil, including São Paulo, Rio de Janeiro, Recife and Belo Horizonte.

In 2016, AntiGravity produced The Rocky Horror Show with Red Fish Theatre in Orlando, Florida.

== Television appearances ==
AntiGravity first appeared on television during the 1991 Miss America Pageant in a segment called “Extreme Dance” by choreographer Scott Salmon. In the same year, they performed a segment for the NBA All-Star Game half-time show, as well as a television special “NBA All-Star Stay in School Jam” with MC Hammer.

1n 2002, AntiGravity was featured on Fox’s Good Day New York newscast, as well as ABC’s Good Morning America. This was followed by a feature of the company on NBC’s Today Show in 2003.

=== 2002 Winter Olympics ===
The 2002 Winter Olympic Games Organizing Committee in Salt Lake City hired Harrison and AntiGravity for nightly Olympics Medal Plaza performances, and upon seeing them perform, choreographer Kenny Ortega chose them for the final act for the Closing Ceremonies. The group went on last because their trademark “AntiGravity Boots” shattered the ice during the performance.

=== Awards shows ===
For the 2002 MTV Video Awards, AntiGravity collaborated with rapper/producer P. Diddy and rapper Busta Rhymes in a number featuring Usher and Pharrell.

In 2003, AntiGravity performed with No Doubt in a feature song presentation during the 45th Annual Grammy Awards, as well as working with Michael Jackson during the 2003 Radio Music Awards.

AntiGravity also appeared in the BET Awards in 2007 and 2008 in performances featuring Nelly, Fergie, and 50 Cent.

=== 2009 Neighborhood Inaugural Ball ===
In January 2009, AntiGravity performed a televised aerial performance for the Neighborhood Inaugural Ball at the Washington Convention Center, following the Inauguration of President Barack Obama. The event was broadcast nationally by ABC.

=== SMASH! ===
On April 2, 2013 AntiGravity appeared on the ninth episode of the NBC television show Smash (TV series) entitled The Parents. In the episode, AntiGravity was brought in to choreograph and premier an aerial silk number from the fictional Hit List (musical) at a charity benefit for the subscribers of Manhattan Theatre Workshop. The number entitled Reach For Me was written by composer Andrew McMahon and sung by actress Krysta Rodriguez.

== AntiGravity Fitness ==
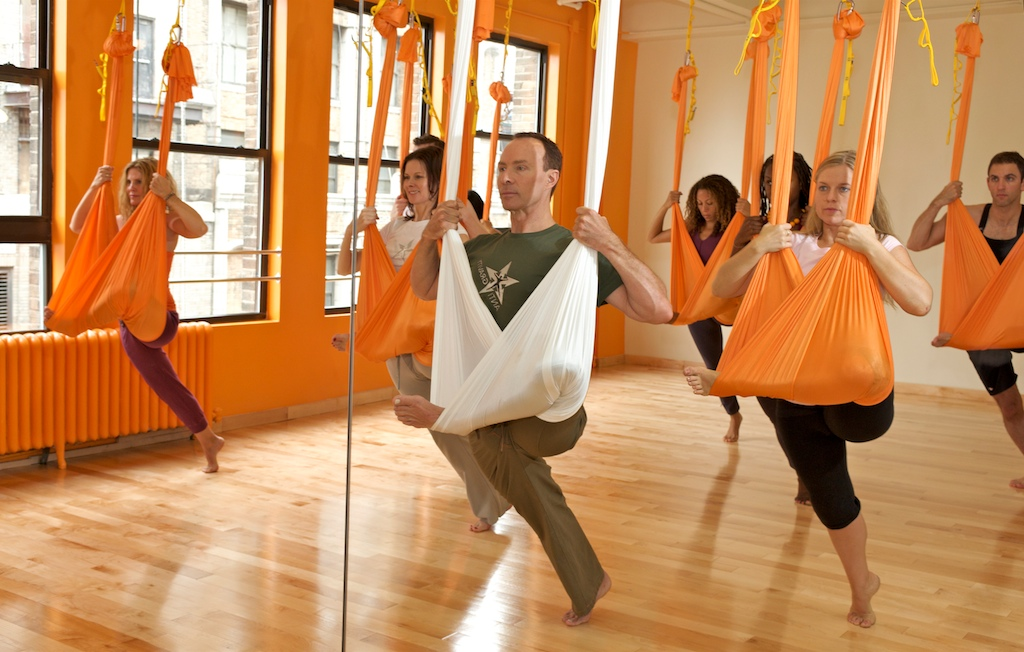
AntiGravity Aerial Yoga

In 2007, AntiGravity founder Christopher Harrison launched a fitness technique called AntiGravity Aerial Yoga, which he then licensed to various fitness centers, including Virgin Active Fitness in Milan, Steve Nash Fitness World in Vancouver, British Columbia, Madonna's Hard Candy Fitness in Moscow, and Crunch Fitness gyms throughout the US. Since the launch of the initial technique, Harrison has combined yoga practices, pilates, ballet barre exercises, and strength training techniques into multiple exercise curriculums under the brand AntiGravity Fitness.
