= AeroSuperBatics =

British civilian formation aerobatics and wing-walking team

AeroSuperBatics Limited
- AeroSuperBatics logo
- Active: 1982–present
- Country: United Kingdom
- Branch: civilian
- Type: biplane aerobatic formation and wingwalking team
- Role: public airshows, corporate events, personal wingwalking experiences
- Size: 4 aircraft, 5 pilots, 6 wing walkers
- Base & registered office: RFC Rendcomb Aerodrome, Cirencester, Gloucestershire, England, GL7 7DF
- Motto: Excellence in Wingwalking
- Website: AeroSuperBatics.com

Aircraft flown
- Boeing–Stearman Model 75 biplane – x4

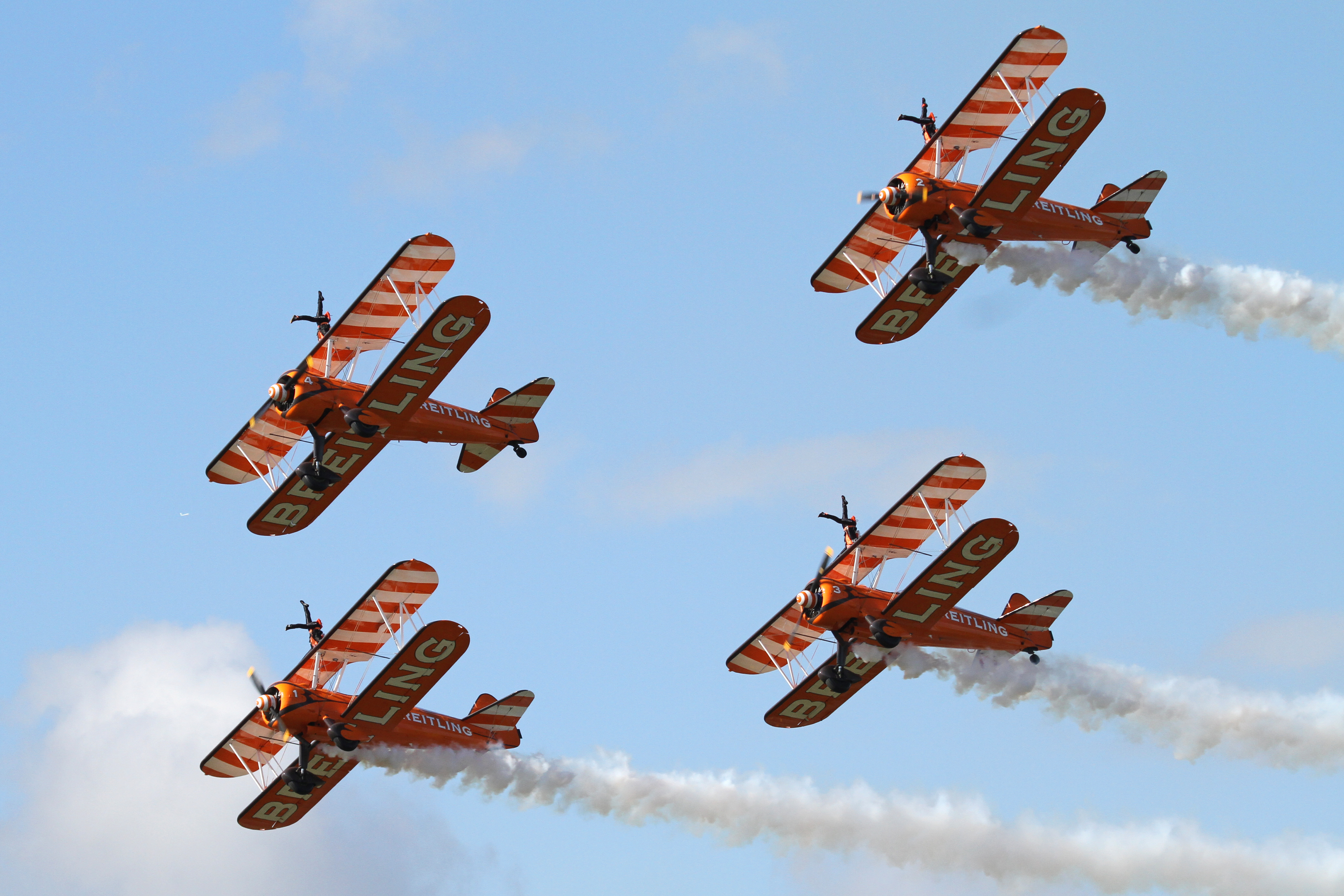
Breitling Wingwalkers four-ship display, July 2011.

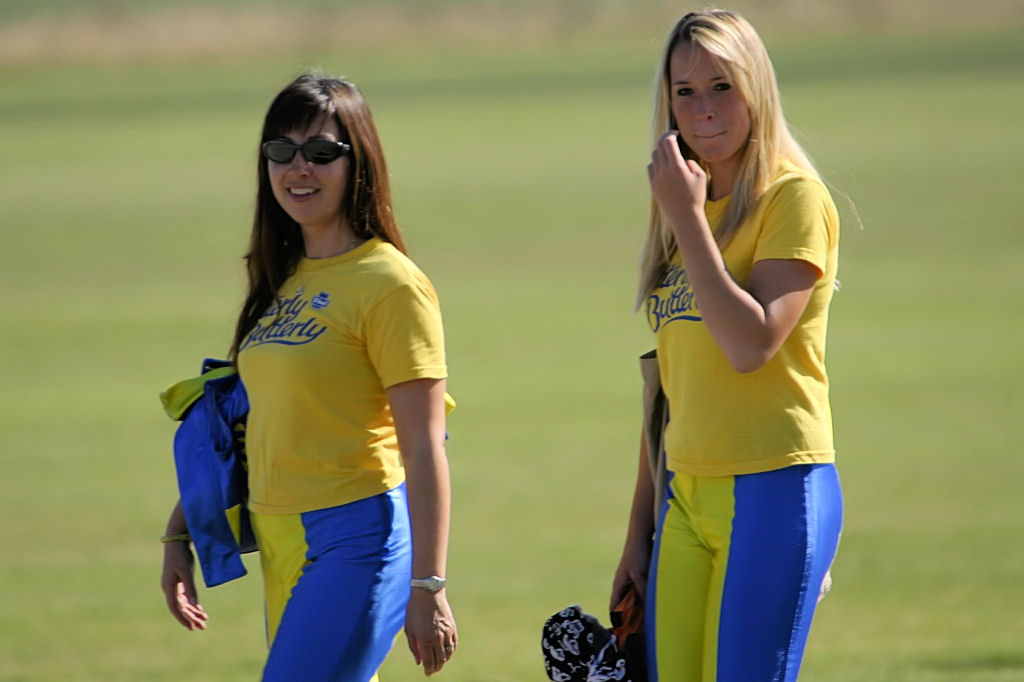
Utterly Butterly wingwalkers, 2004.

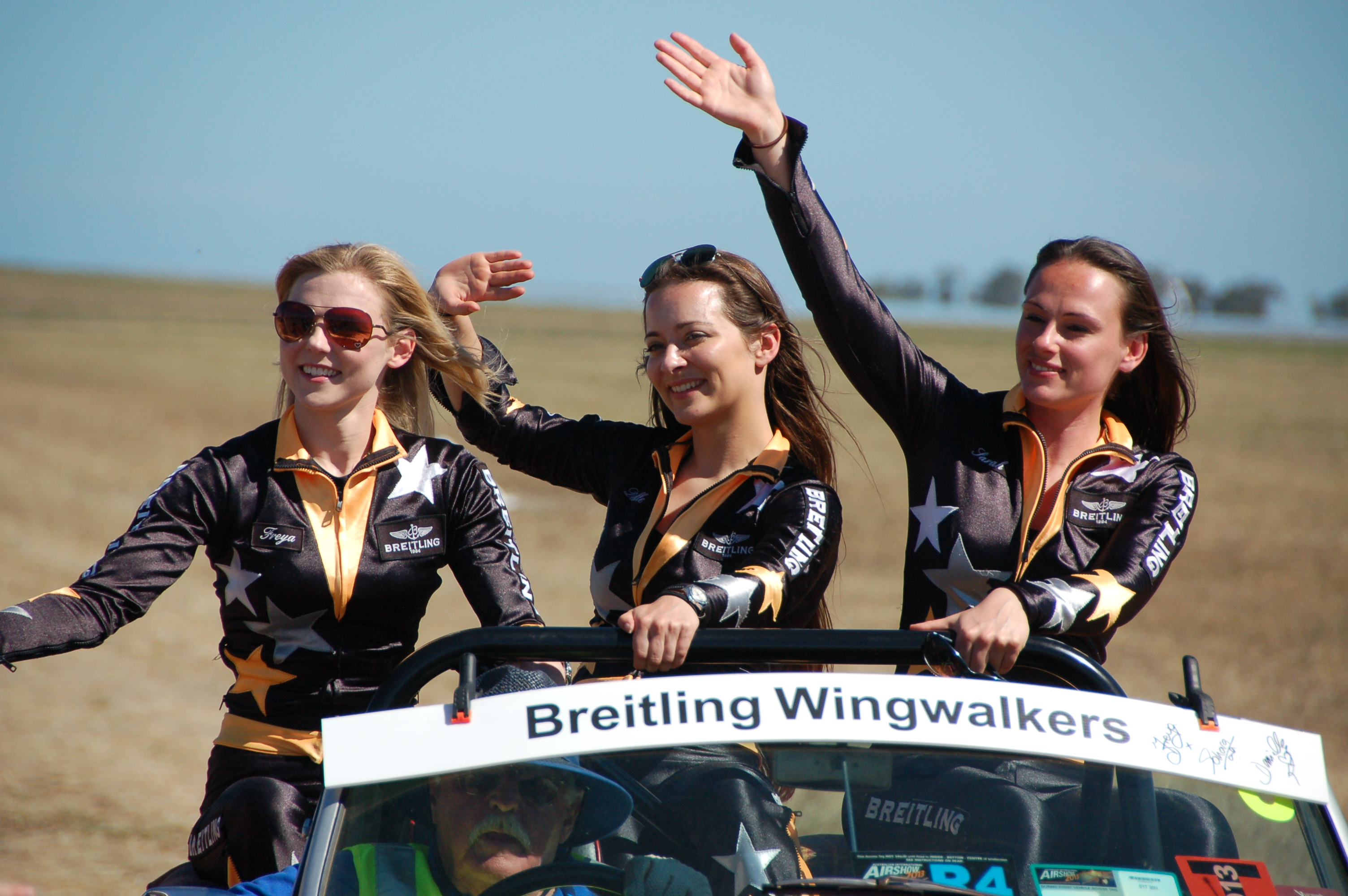
Breitling wingwalkers, 2013.

AeroSuperBatics Limited, legally known as Aero-Super-Batics Limited, and commonly known merely as AeroSuperBatics, is a British civilian biplane multi-aircraft formation aerobatics and wingwalking team. They currently perform as The AeroSuperBatics Wingwalkers (unsponsored since 2018), and were branded as 'The Flying Circus' in 2018. They were previously branded Breitling 'Swiss Chronographs' (performing as The Breitling Wingwalkers, 2011 to 2018) in accordance with their sponsorship agreement with the Swiss watch manufacturer Breitling. Prior to that, branding included Guinot 'Institut Paris' (performing as Team Guinot, 2008 to 2009), Colt Cars, St.Ivel 'Utterly Butterly' (performing as The Utterly Butterlys, 1999 to 2007), Cadbury's 'Crunchie' (performing as the 'Crunchie Flying Circus', 1992 to 1998), and Yugo Cars, according to their commercial sponsors at the time. Their display options currently consist of either a solo aircraft, or a two-ship formation pair, or a three-ship display, and previously included a four-ship formation, and during the 2008 display season, a five-ship formation. They are the world's only formation wingwalking team.

== History and operation ==
The AeroSuperBatics display team (as it was later to be known by) was founded in 1982; 44 years ago, by veteran aerobatics pilot and now honorary air commodore of 614 Squadron RAuxAF RAF Reserve Vic Norman, initially operating a sole Zlin Z-50 in a traditional display role. During the mid 1980s, Vic and his wife attended an airshow at Salinas in the USA; it was there that he first witnessed wingwalking with a Boeing Stearman, and this was the seed that sparked Vic's idea of bringing wingwalking to the United Kingdom, which was only happening in the UK on top of a Tiger Moth. Upon his return to the UK, Vic managed to get a flight in a 450 horsepower (340 kilowatts) Boeing Stearman, newly owned by Ray Hanna; Vic subsequently purchased the Stearman from Hanna. A wingwalking rig for the Stearman had been created and certified in the USA by Art Scholl, though Scholl was reluctant to allow others to use his rig, due to fears of getting hurt whilst using it. After Scholl was killed in 1985 during filming backdrop scenes for the film Top Gun, his widow gave the wingwalking rig plans to Norman, thus allowing Norman to replicate a wingwalking rig on his own recently acquired Stearman. As Norman was still displaying his Zlin, Norman persuaded Bob Thomson to fly his Stearman, with Lesley Gail becoming their first wing walker.

In the early stages of the company, commercial sponsors were the key enabling Norman to expand his display business. The change in company name to AeroSuperBatics occurred around the same time as Yugo Cars became their first sponsor. Following Yugo was Cadbury's in 1989, and this enabled Norman to expand his fleet to two Stearmans. Successive sponsors included St Ivel, Guinot from France, and latterly Breitling from Switzerland. The team expanded to display up to five Stearman aircraft simultaneously at one airshow programme in 2008, and the five-ship performed a wingwalking display in their new big V 'Vulcan' formation, as a homage to the return to flight of a former Royal Air Force (RAF) Avro Vulcan XH558, as restored by the Vulcan To The Sky Trust. In 1992, Norman became a full time wingwalking pilot for the team.

AeroSuperBatics currently operates four modified Boeing–Stearman Model 75 biplanes. Their original 220 horsepower (160 kilowatts) Continental radial engines were replaced with a 450 horsepower (340 kilowatts) 985 cubic inches (16 litres) Pratt & Whitney R-985-AN14B 'Junior Wasp' engine, driving a Hamilton Standard 2D30/6101A-12 constant speed propeller. AeroSuperBatics currently employs five male pilots and six female wing walkers.

The team currently offer the following display show options; consisting of either one aircraft (solo), two (formation pair), or a three-ship display, (and previously offered a four and five aircraft option). The display consists of aerobatic manoeuvres, with female acrobats attached to a harness and tether to post above the wings who engage in wingwalking activities. The team is based at its current registered office location of RFC Rendcomb Aerodrome, a former World War 1 training aerodrome of the Royal Flying Corps (RFC), and now private airfield near Cirencester, Gloucestershire, which is co-owned by Vic Norman and two business partners (which include Nick Mason, drummer of Pink Floyd). Although UK based, and regular participants at some of the UKs leading airshows, the team are also regular visitors to many European airshows, along with performances in Asia and the Middle East; its furthest displays being performed in Japan, the Philippines, and Australia.

AeroSuperBatics also offer the opportunity for members of the public to experience wingwalking, and can also be used for charitable fundraising and corporate events. The team have also taken many famous notable people wingwalking, including: Richard Branson, Bear Grylls, Elon Musk, Francis Rossi and Rick Parfitt (both of Status Quo), the Crown Prince of Dubai, along with many others; from musicians, sports personnel, racing car drivers, broadcast presenters, journalists, actors, and royalty. They have flown on the wing from as young as age 9, up to 95 year olds. AeroSuperBatics hold two Guinness World Records; for the most consecutive wingwalking rolls (10), and for the shortest person to wing walk (1.263 metres (4 feet 1.7 inches)). They facilitated the world's first wedding on the wing at 1,000 feet (300 m), using three of their aircraft, one each for the bride, the groom, and the officiating reverend.

== Accidents and incidents ==
On 4 September 2021, as part of a two-ship formation wingwalking display at the Bournemouth Air Festival, one of the AeroSuperBatics Boeing Stearman aircraft crashed into the sea near the Sandbanks Ferry, Poole Harbour, after the biplane suffered an unrecoverable mechanical failure of its engine. The wing walker, Kirsten Pobjoy (who was able to return to the cockpit immediately prior to the crash), received minor injuries, the pilot David Barrell (in the rear cockpit) was unhurt. They were both promptly rescued from the water by a nearby motorboat, assessed by event medical staff at the scene, and subsequently transferred to a local hospital for further medical examination. Both were released from medical care later the same day. The aircraft, significantly damaged due to its impact with the sea, was later recovered from its sea crash site by a crane on instruction by the harbour operator. Following a Field Investigation by the United Kingdom's Air Accidents Investigation Branch (AAIB) at Farnborough Airport, it was discovered that the crashed aircraft had lost power to its engine, this was caused by the failure of a metal strap supporting the oil feed pipe to the engine, and the oil feed pipe breaking at its connection to the engine. The aircraft was destroyed following its ditching into the sea. In the aftermath of this crash and the findings by the AAIB, AeroSuperBatics modified another engine that had the same design, and developed a new set of hand signal communications between pilot and wing walker, to advise of any mechanical issues and additional emergency procedures.

== Pilot controversy ==
In April 2022, AeroSuperBatics and former Red Arrows pilot Andy Cubin MBE pleaded guilty at Swindon Magistrates' Court to possession of incident images of children, including images in the 'most serious category', and he was committed to Crown Court for sentencing. In September 2021, while on bail before sentencing, he flew an AeroSuperBatics biplane without notifying AeroSuperBatics, and took part in a two-ship wingwalking formation display at the Bournemouth Air Festival; when the other AeroSuperBatics biplane crashed into the sea. In response to his criminal conviction, AeroSuperBatics stated that they had "immediately terminated any association with him".

== Gallery ==
AeroSuperBatics evolution of liveries
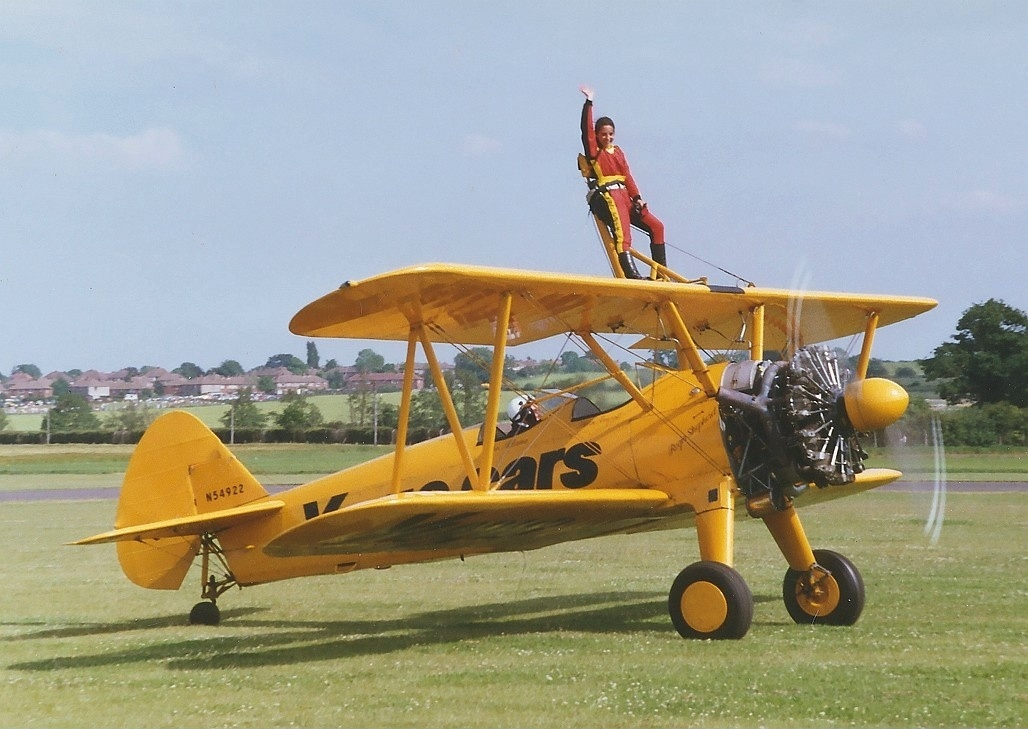
Yugo Cars livery, 1989

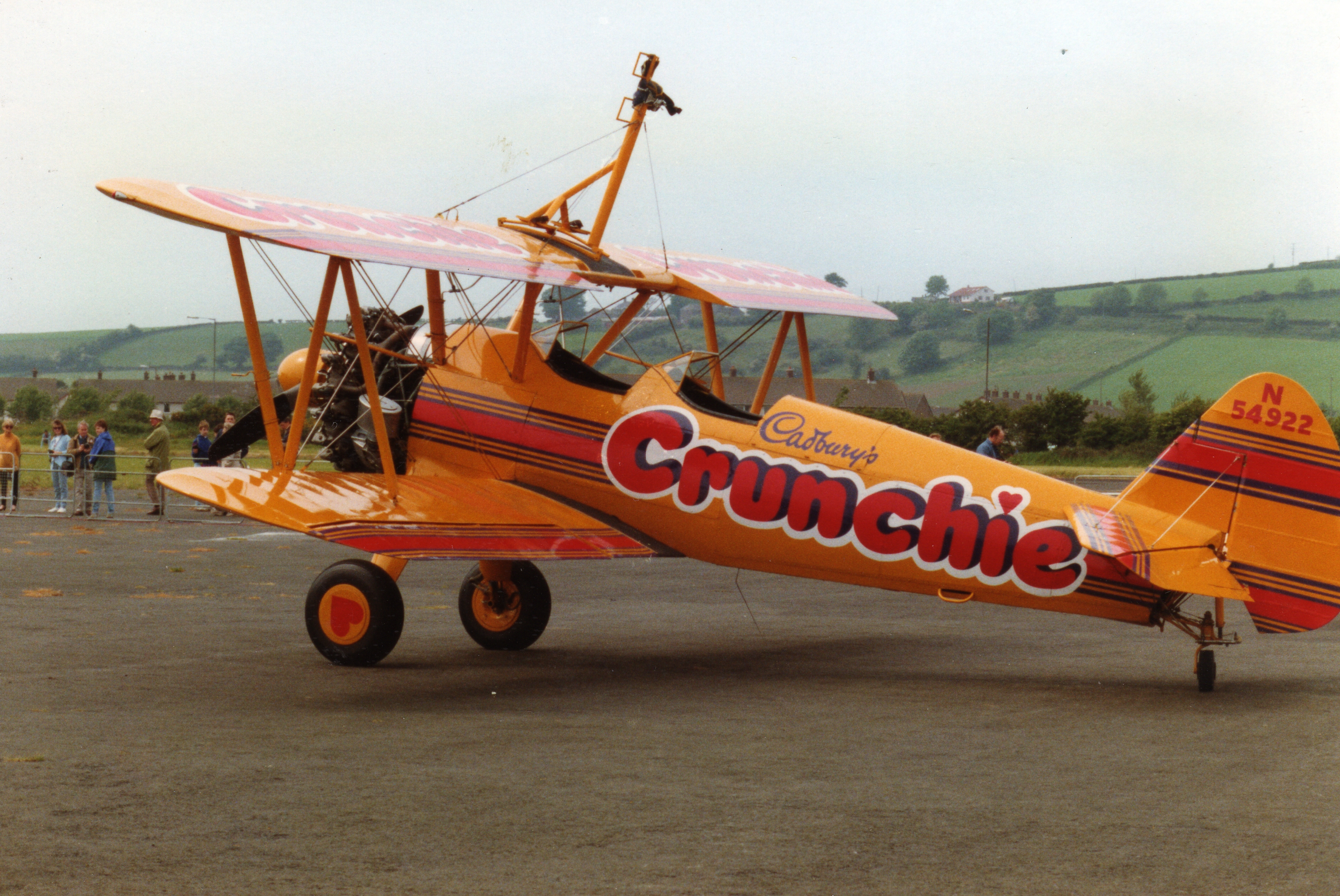
Crunchie livery, June 1991.

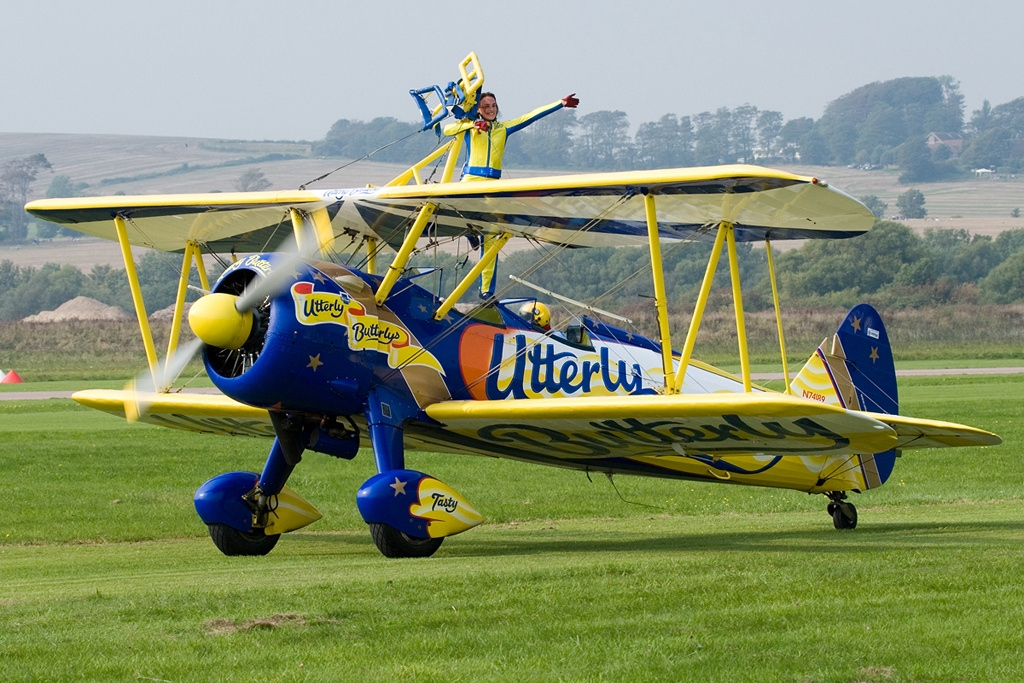
Utterly Butterly livery, September 2006.

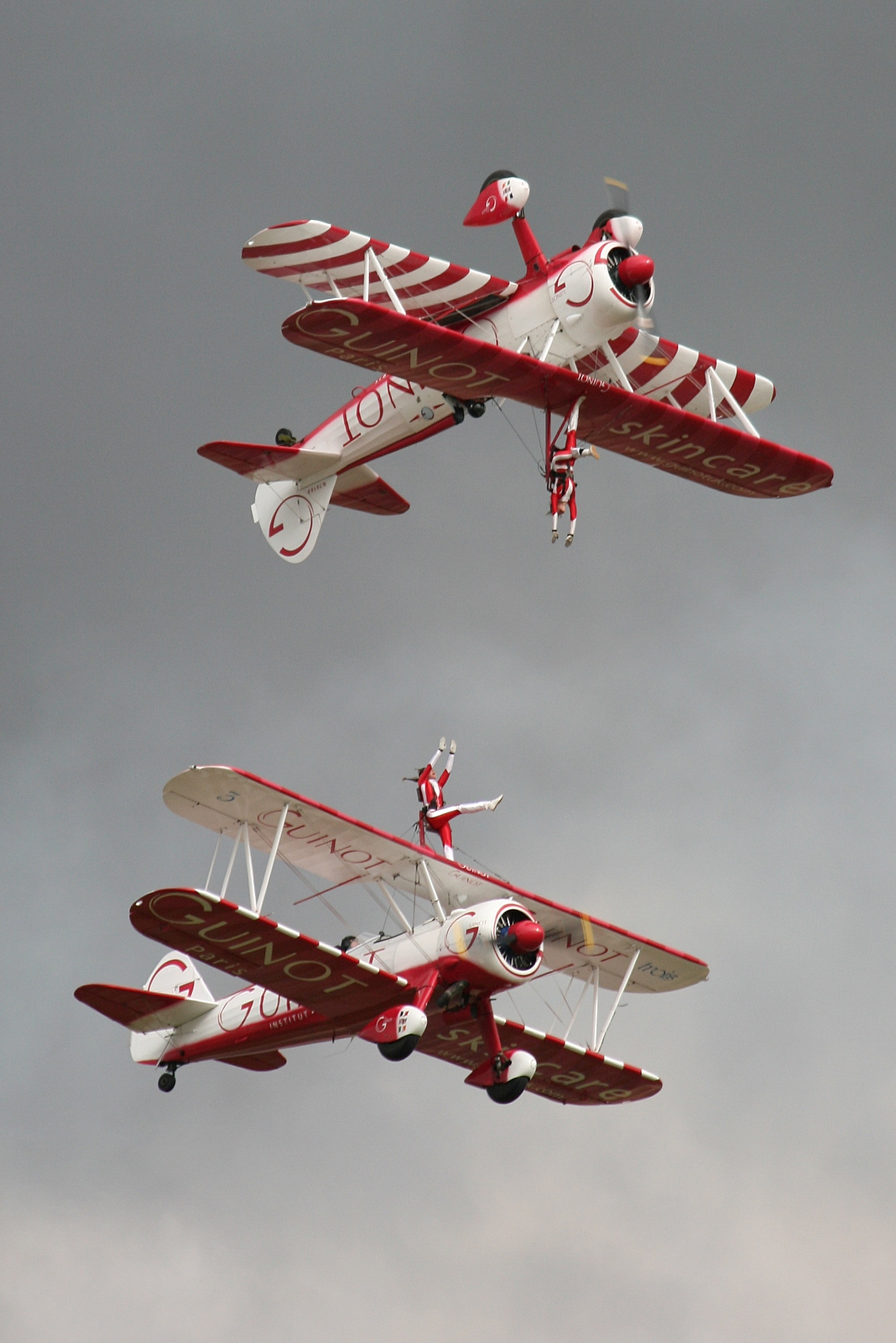
Team Guinot livery, July 2008.

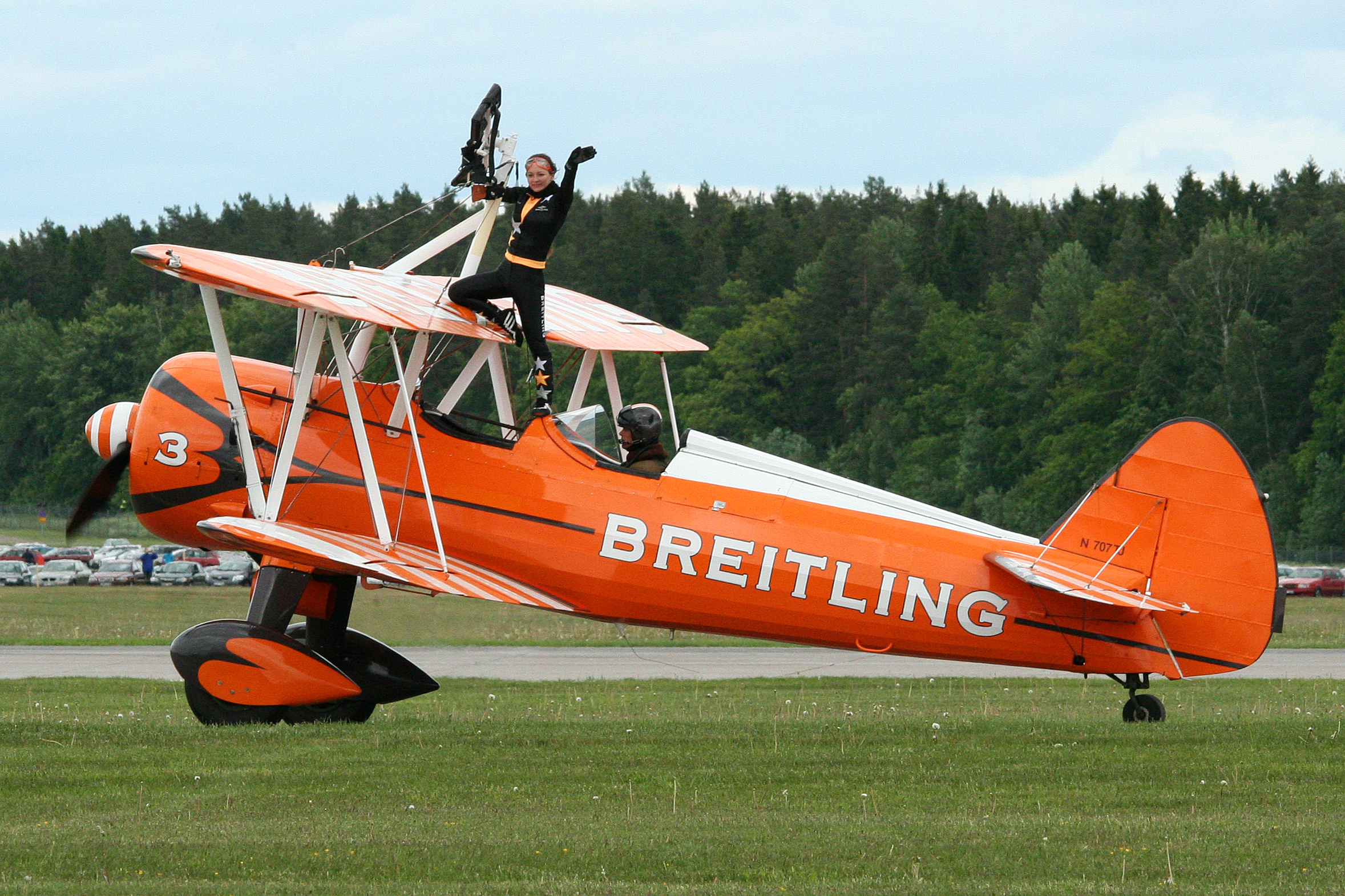
Breitling livery, June 2012.

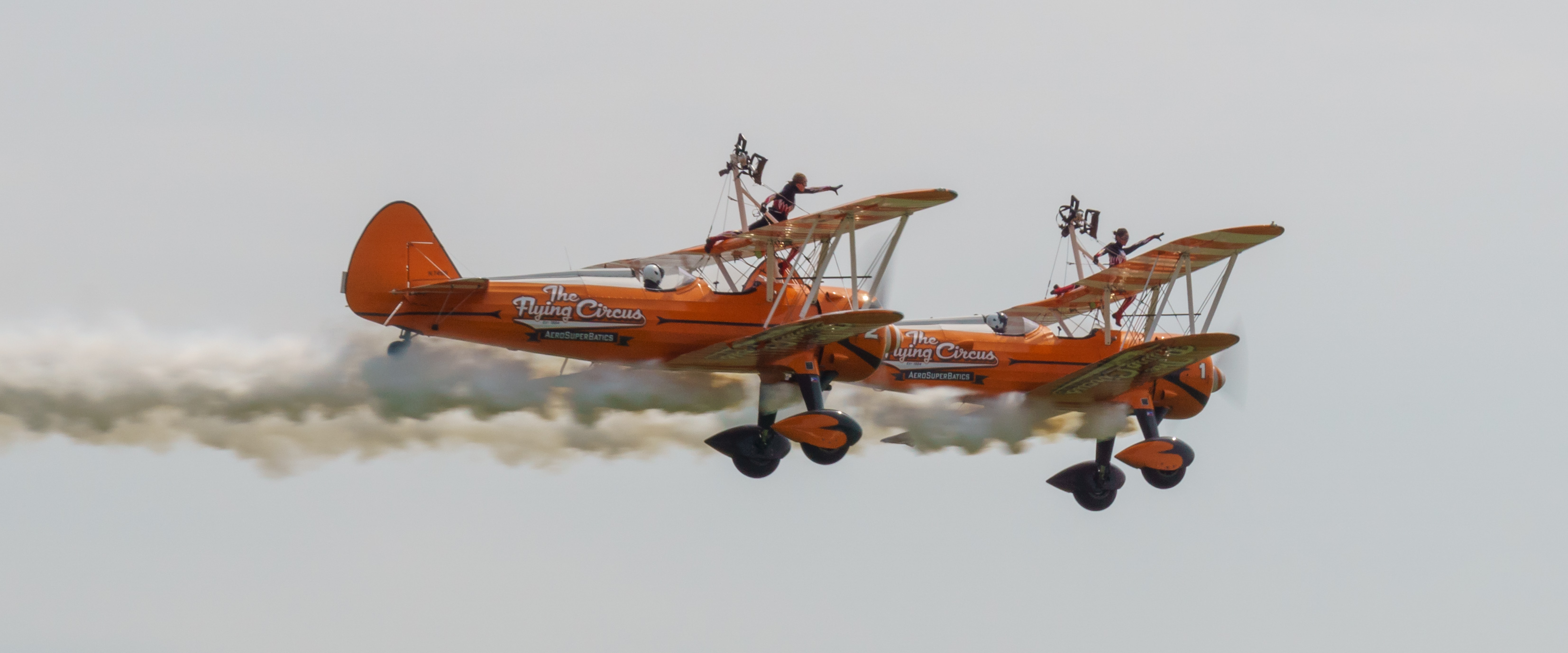
The Flying Circus livery, May 2018

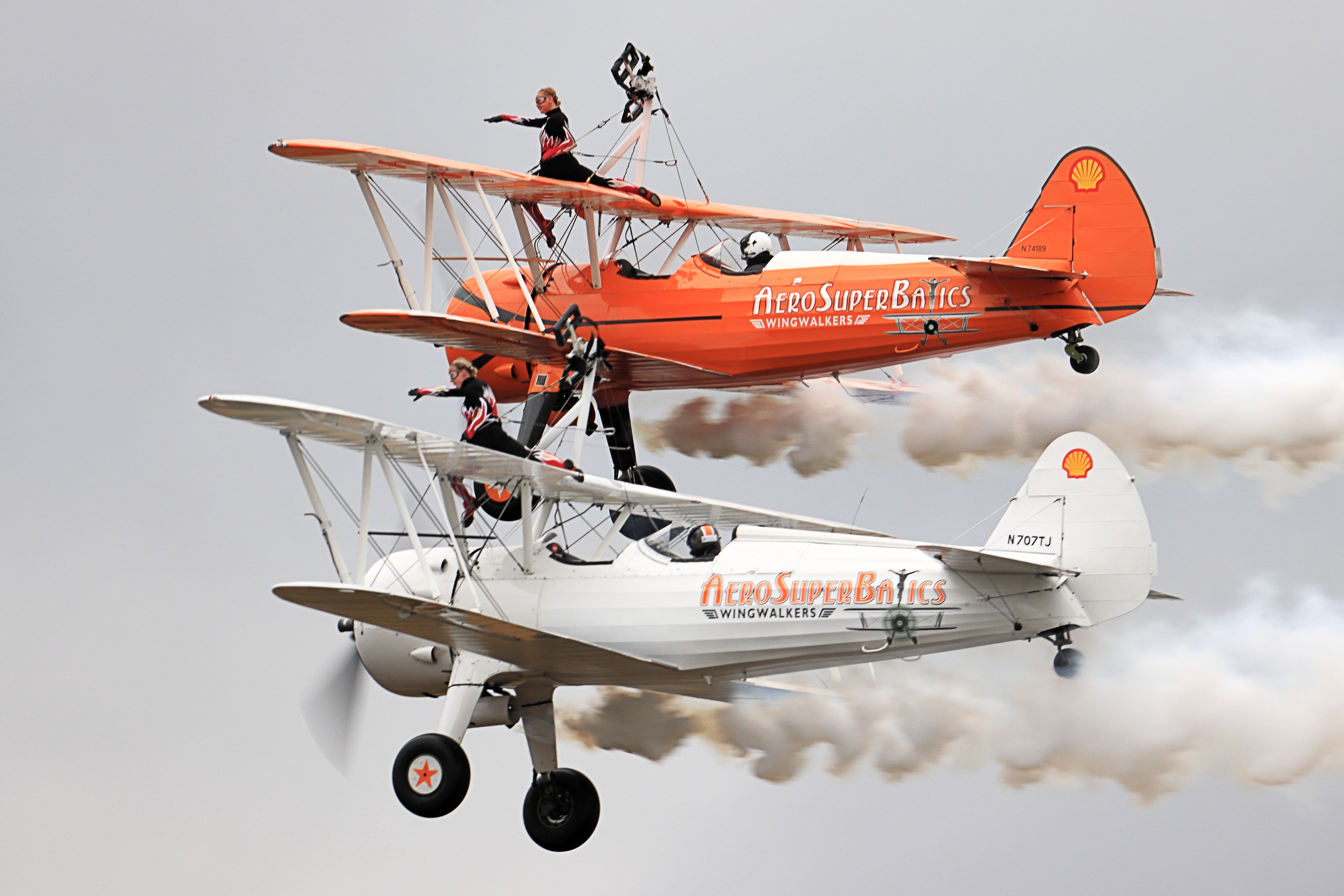
Unsponsored current livery, August 2021.
