= 2012 Masters Guinot-Mary Cohr =

The 2012 Masters Guinot-Mary Cohr is a tennis team exhibition event played the week before the French Open. It is played on clay and features two teams, Guinot (red) and Mary Cohr (green). This year featured 9 rubbers to the usual 6 rubbers to the previous years that it was played.

== Players ==
=== Guinot ===
- (Argentina) David Nalbandian (#40) (Captain)
- (United Kingdom) Andy Murray (#4)
- (Argentina) Juan Martín del Potro (#9)
- (Argentina) Juan Mónaco (#15)
- (Spain) Fernando Verdasco (#16)
- (Cyprus) Marcos Baghdatis (#41)
- (France) Michaël Llodra (#57)
- (France) Arnaud Clément (#139)
- (France) Paul-Henri Mathieu (#258)

=== Mary Cohr ===
- (France) Julien Benneteau (#32) (Captain)
- (France) Jo-Wilfried Tsonga (#5)
- (Ukraine) Alexandr Dolgopolov (#19)
- (Switzerland) Stanislas Wawrinka (#21)
- (Russia) Mikhail Youzhny (#30)
- (South Africa) Kevin Anderson (#34)
- (Latvia) Ernests Gulbis (#92)
- (Canada) Vasek Pospisil (#102)
- (Italy) Simone Bolelli (#111)

== Score ==
Guinot	Mary Cohr
4	5

== Draw ==
=== Day 1 ===
Guinot
2
Paris Golf and Country Club, Paris
23 May 2012
Clay (outdoors)
Mary Cohr
1

			1	2	3
1	(France) (Ukraine)	Michaël Llodra; Alexandr Dolgopolov	6; 1	6; 4
2	(Argentina) (Italy)	Juan Martín del Potro; Simone Bolelli	6^{3} 7^{7}	4; 6
3	(France) (South Africa)	Paul-Henri Mathieu; Kevin Anderson	6; 3	6; 1

=== Day 2 ===
Guinot
1
Paris Golf and Country Club, Paris
24 May 2012
Clay (outdoors)
Mary Cohr
2

			1	2	3
1	(United Kingdom) (Latvia)	Andy Murray; Ernests Gulbis	6^{4} 7^{7}	6^{4} 7^{7}
2	(Spain) (Canada)	Fernando Verdasco; Vasek Pospisil	7; 5	3; 6	10; 4
3	(Cyprus) (Switzerland)	Marcos Baghdatis; Stanislas Wawrinka	5; 7	7; 5	7; 10

=== Day 3 ===
Guinot
1
Paris Golf and Country Club, Paris
25 May 2012
Clay (outdoors)
Mary Cohr
2

			1	2	3
1	(Argentina) (France)	Juan Mónaco; Jo-Wilfried Tsonga	1; 6	2; 6
2	(France) (Russia)	Arnaud Clément; Mikhail Youzhny	1; 6	4; 6
3	(Argentina) (France)	David Nalbandian (Guinot Captain); Julien Benneteau (Mary Cohr Captain)	6; 2	6; 2
