= AntiGravity Fitness =

American company

- Type: Privately-held company
- Industry: Physical fitness
- Founded: 2007; 19 years ago
- Founder: Christopher Calvin Harrison
- Headquarters: New York City
- Number of locations: 600+ licensed studios
- Products: Harrison AntiGravity Hammock
- Services: Program licensing, product sales, teacher trainings, fitness instruction
- Parent: AntiGravity, Inc
- Website: antigravityfitness.com

AntiGravity Fitness is a fitness company founded by Christopher Calvin Harrison in 2007 and based in New York City, specializing in hybrid aerial fitness techniques that combine silk hammocks with modern yoga, pilates, barre exercises, and traditional strength training techniques for aerialists into different exercise curriculums.

Harrison first developed the initial program, AntiGravity aerial yoga, based on warm-up exercises through which he would lead his athletes as director/choreographer of the performance troupe AntiGravity, Inc.

== History ==
In 1991, Christopher Harrison founded AntiGravity, Inc, an acrobatic troupe, to choreograph a performance for the New York Marathon. In the following decade, they performed in hundreds of live shows, corporate events, and advertising campaigns.

In 1997, AntiGravity performed during the opening ceremonies of the Femina Miss India pageant, and Harrison, while unable to perform due to injury, cites this time in India as his first exposure to yoga and a major influence on the development of aerial yoga and what would become AntiGravity Fitness.

During a retreat at Club Med, Harrison and his performers came across a gazebo with hammocks hanging from the ceiling. After experimenting and developing a few flips, they hung up similar hammocks in their New York City rehearsal studio, The AntiGravity Skyloft Harrison states that they soon discovered that "hanging upside down for a minute would take all the kinks out". The hammocks soon became a regular part of their warm-up routine.

== See also ==
- Muscle & Fitness
- FTM Fitness World
