= Aerial yoga =

Hybrid yoga practice with the use of a hammock

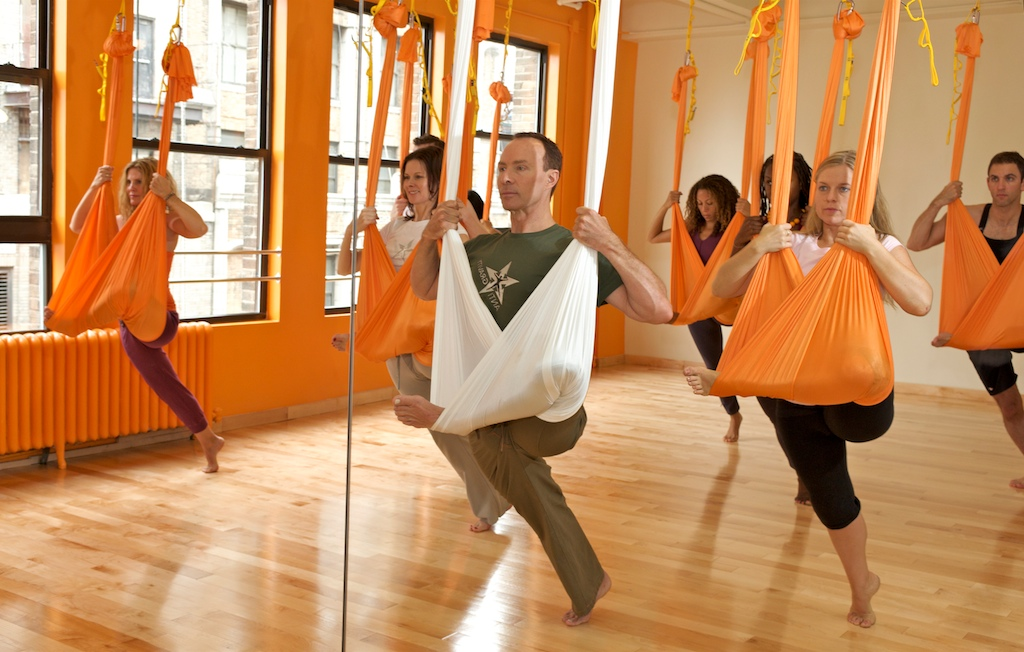
An aerial yoga class practising Flying Pigeon Pose, a variant of Rajakapotasana

Aerial yoga is a hybrid type of yoga developed by Michelle Dortignac in 2006 combining traditional yoga poses, pilates, and dance with the use of a hammock. By 2009, this was followed by multiple aerial yoga brands including Florie Ravinet's Fly Yoga, Rafael Martinez's AeroYoga, and Carmen Curtis's AIReal Yoga.

== History ==
Aerial yoga was developed by Michelle Dortignac in 2006, using a combination of traditional yoga poses, pilates, and dance with the use of a hammock. Fly Yoga was developed in France in 2009 by Florie Ravinet in collaboration with a physical therapist, and has been "approved by health professionals". AeroYoga was developed around the same time by Rafael Martinez.

The AntiGravity Fitness brand was founded by Christopher Harrison in 2007; it claims to have created what became known as aerial yoga, with a hammock adapted for yoga from aerial arts. AntiGravity had been in existence since 1990 as a performance company of athletes and acrobats.

AIReal Yoga was founded by Carmen Curtis. Its 200 hour training course was registered with Yoga Alliance in August 2013. According to LA Yoga magazine, this made AIReal Yoga the first aerial yoga school to be registered by Yoga Alliance.

== Hammock ==
Aerial yoga requires a special kind of hammock, a prop designed to support up to 300 kilograms on average. The rig typically consists of support chains, a webbing strap, a silk hammock and carabiners. Two support chains hang from the ceiling to less than one meter above ground level, and the hammock is connected at the height set by the user. There are two styles of installing an aerial yoga hammock, depending on the effects desired: either two anchor points (for more stability) or one anchor point, to give the participant an increased range of motion.

The hammock acts like a swing supporting the hips for forward bends and backbends. Difficult mat-based yoga postures may prove easier to perform through aerial yoga, while the hammock's movement further contributes to adding variety to the aerial workout.

== Health benefits claimed ==
Aerial yoga has not been studied with clinical trials. Anecdotal evidence indicates that by facilitating bending and stretching of the whole body during exercise, muscles and joints will be strengthened and rehabilitated, and the spine decompressed as the body hangs freely. Yoga in general, and aerial yoga in particular is promoted as benefiting emotional, psychological and spiritual health.

== Popular poses ==
Aerial yoga poses include the cross position, leaning back with support just above the waist, arms outspread; the star inversion, the hammock supporting the tailbone with the body bending backwards; and the one-legged king pigeon pose, like the star inversion but with one foot hooked across the front of the hammock. A bound variant has the rear ankle grasped by the hands.
