= Guinot =

Guinot is a surname. Notable people with the surname include:

- Bernard Guinot (1925–2017), French astronomer
- Danièle Guinot (born 1933), French biologist
- Eugène Guinot (1805–1861), French journalist, writer, and playwright
- Luis Guinot (1935–2022), American diplomat
- Maria Guinot (1945–2018), Portuguese singer

== See also ==
- Masters Guinot-Mary Cohr
