= Kapotasana =

Kneeling back-bending posture in modern yoga

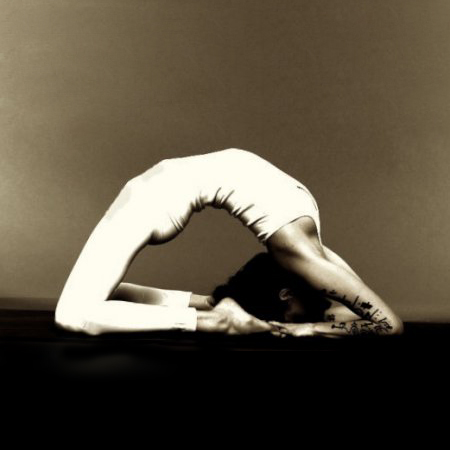
Kapotasana, Pigeon pose, not to be confused with Rajakapotasana, King Pigeon pose

Kapotasana (Sanskrit: कपोतासन; IAST: Kapotāsana) or Pigeon Pose is a kneeling back-bending asana in modern yoga as exercise. Asanas based on One-legged King Pigeon pose, Rajakapotasana, are also sometimes called "Pigeon".

== Etymology and origins ==
The name comes from the Sanskrit words kapota (कपोत) meaning "pigeon" and asana (आसन) meaning "posture" or "seat".

A different (standing) pose is given the name Kapotasana in the 19th century Sritattvanidhi. The modern pose is described in the 20th century in Light on Yoga.

Asanas based on King Pigeon pose or Rajakapotasana are sometimes called Pigeon; for example, Yoga Journal describes a reclining (prone) variation of Eka Pada Rajakapotasana, One-Legged King Pigeon pose, as Pigeon.

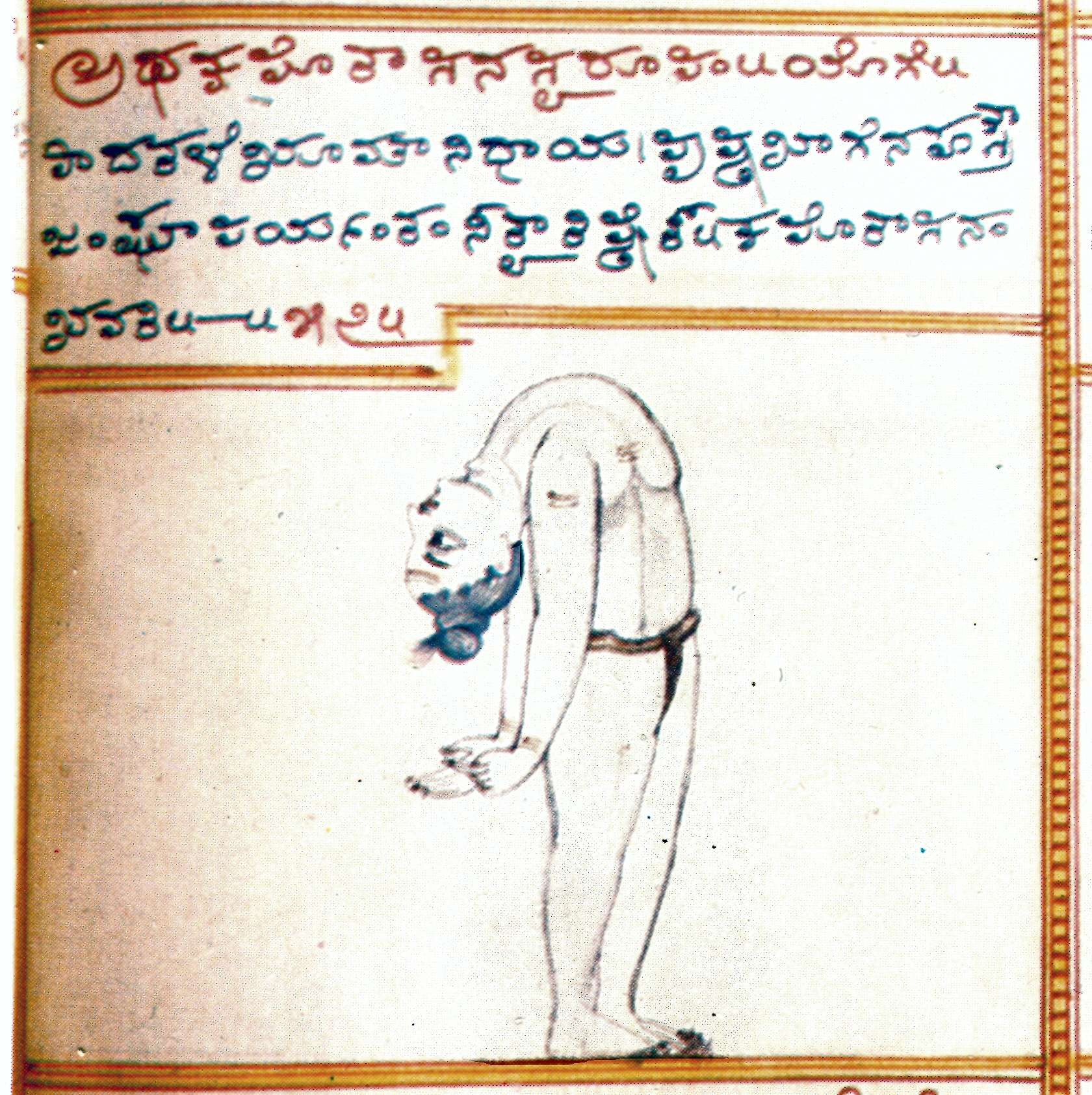
The standing pose named "Kapotasana" in the 19th century Sritattvanidhi

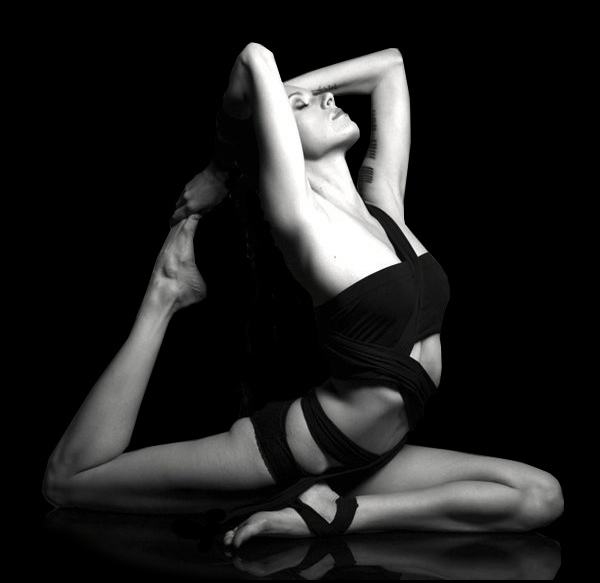
Rajakapotasana, King Pigeon pose, is sometimes abbreviated to "Pigeon".

== Description ==
A pose from the Ashtanga tradition, Kapotasana is an advanced asana which resembles Chakrasana, or Wheel Pose. The shins and forearms are on the ground, the front body stretched upwards in the air. The pose is reached by going into a backbend with knees on the ground. It requires flexibility to bring the head back until it reaches the ground. Kapotasana helps to open up the chest, and strengthens the back and groin. It opens and increases the flexibility of the hips, at the same time strengthening the back, and stretching the thighs and the groin.

In Iyengar Yoga, practitioners begin by lying in Supta Virasana, bending the arms and placing the arms beside the head. They then press the hands, exhale and raise the hips and trunk. The crown of the head can be placed on the floor, and hands can be walked towards the feet by raising the trunk higher.

== See also ==
- List of asanas

== Sources ==
- Iyengar, B. K. S. (1979) [1966]. Light on Yoga: Yoga Dipika. Unwin Paperbacks. ISBN 978-1855381667.
