= Eka Pada Rajakapotasana =

Seated back-bending posture in modern yoga

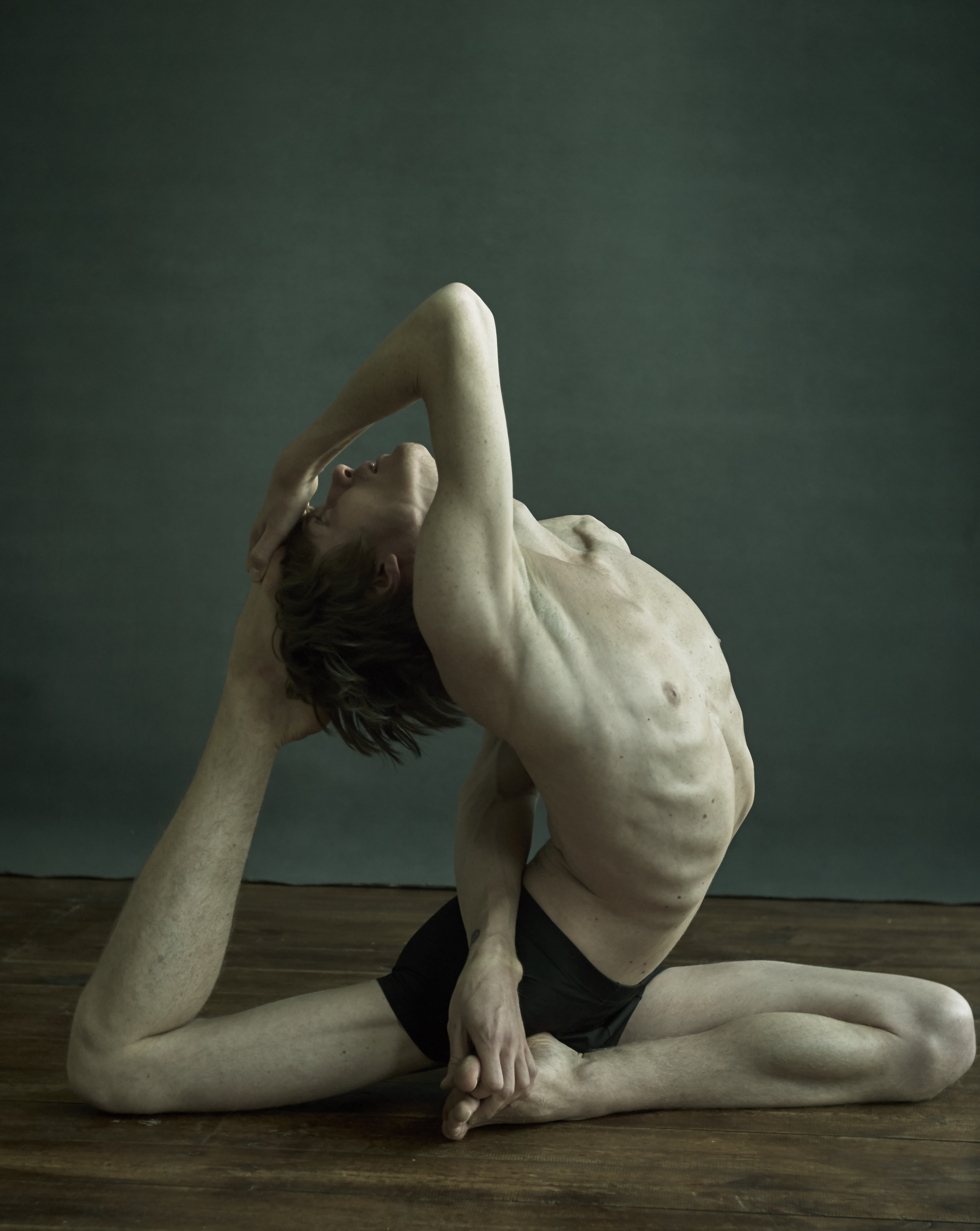
Eka Pada Rajakapotasana I

Eka Pada Rajakapotasana (Sanskrit: एक पाद राजकपोतासन; IAST: Eka Pāda Rājakapotāsana), Rajakapotasana, or [One-legged] King Pigeon Pose is a seated back-bending asana in modern yoga as exercise. The Yin Yoga form of the asana is named Swan Pose, while the Aerial yoga variant, supported in a hammock, is called Flying Pigeon Pose. The basic pose is described in the 20th century by two of Krishnamacharya's pupils, Pattabhi Jois and B. K. S. Iyengar; several other variants have been created. It is one of the yoga poses often used in advertising to convey desired qualities such as flexibility and grace.

== Etymology and origins ==
The name comes from the Sanskrit words eka (एक) meaning "one"; pada (पाद) meaning "foot", rāja (राज) meaning "king", kapota (कपोत) meaning "pigeon" and āsana (आसन) meaning "posture" or "seat".

The pose is described in the 20th century by two of Krishnamacharya's pupils, Pattabhi Jois in his Ashtanga Vinyasa Yoga, and B. K. S. Iyengar in his Light on Yoga.

== Description ==
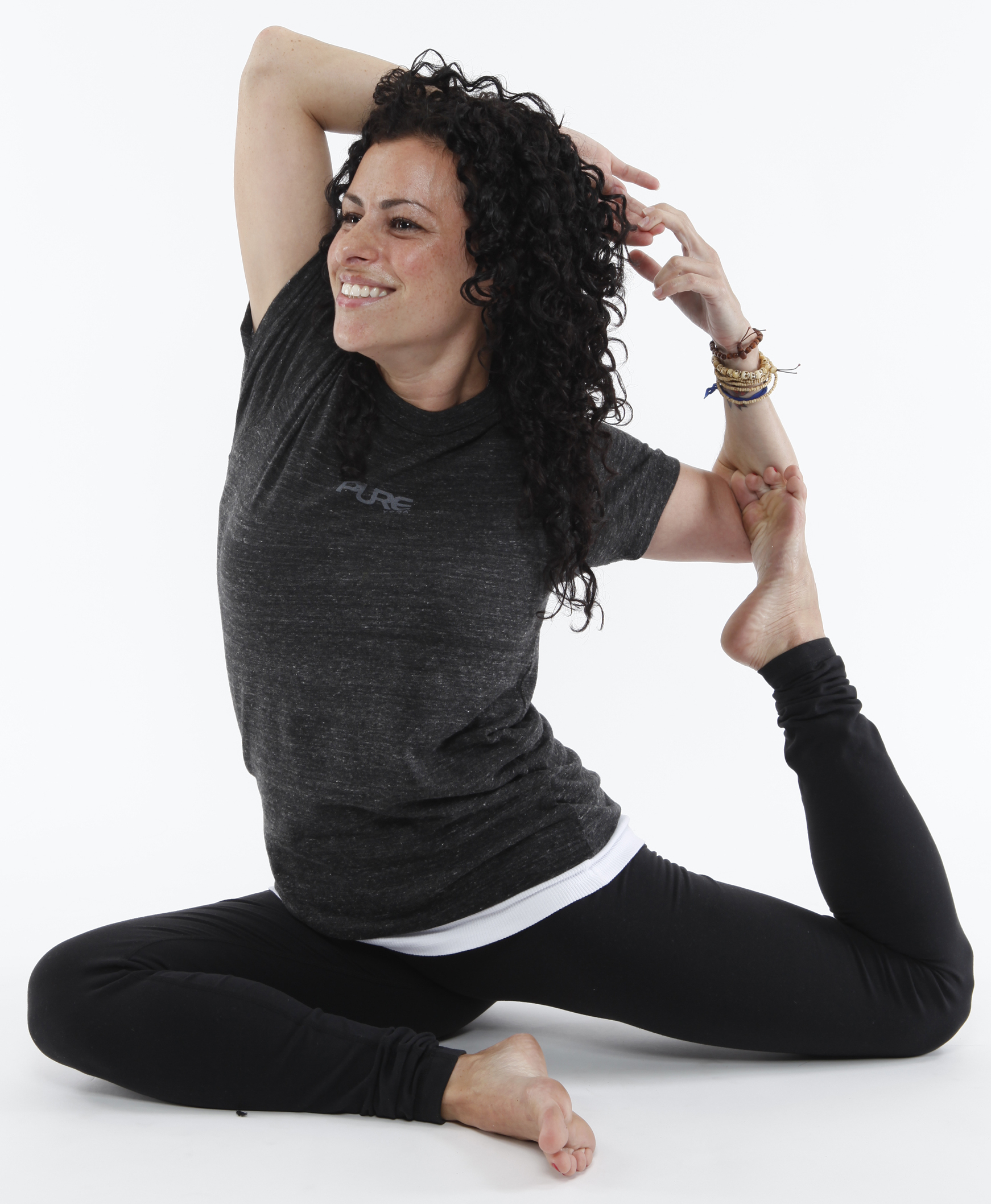
The pose is often used in advertising, as here by Lululemon in 2011.

Starting from sitting in Dandasana (stick pose), one knee is bent, keeping the knee on the floor, so the foot is just in front of the groin, and the other leg is taken straight back. For the completed pose bend the knee of the rear leg, and grasp the foot or ankle with one or both hands. Rajakapotasana is described as strongly hip-opening, both increasing the outward rotation of the femur in the hip joint of the front leg, and lengthening the hip-flexing psoas muscle of the rear leg. The hip of the front leg can be supported by a repeatedly-folded blanket if it does not descend fully to the floor.

== Variations ==
=== Of Rajakapotasana I ===
In Supported [King] Pigeon or Salamba Kapotasana, the rear leg is straight out and the hands are on the ground beside the hips, reducing the backbend. If comfortable, the back may be arched and the gaze directed straight upwards.

In Sleeping Pigeon (or Sleeping Swan in Yin Yoga), the rear leg is straight with the body and arms stretched forwards over the bent forward leg. This pose is sometimes named "Pigeon", but it is a different pose from the advanced kneeling backbend of Kapotasana.

In Aerial yoga, Flying Pigeon Pose is a hammock-supported variant with one foot hooked across the front of the hammock.

The pose can be practised with the rear knee against a wall, the lower leg vertical with a strap around the foot, working towards the full pose. The strap is grasped with both hands, the arms reversed so that the elbows point upwards.

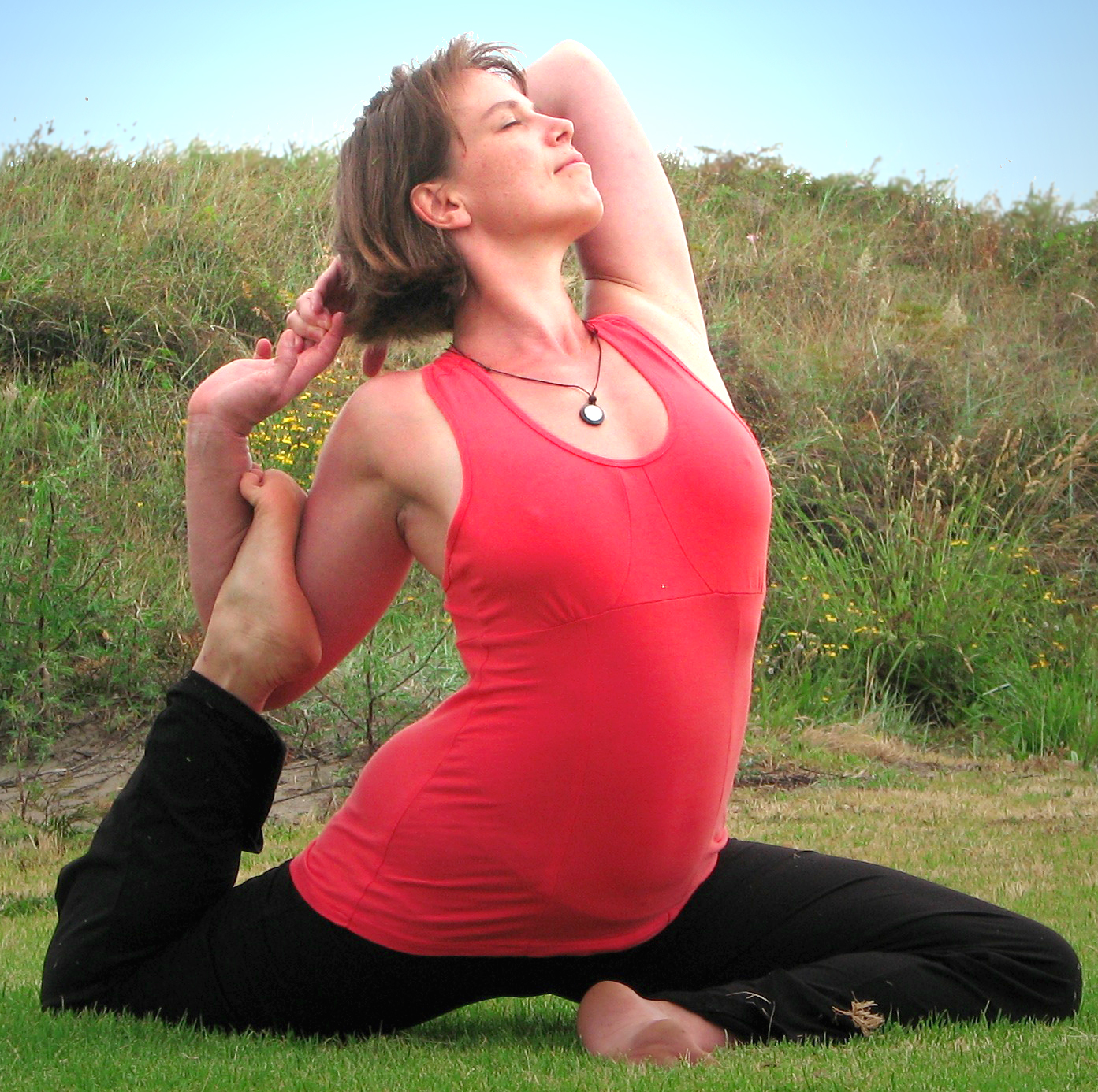
In this variation, the rear foot hooks the arm on the same side.

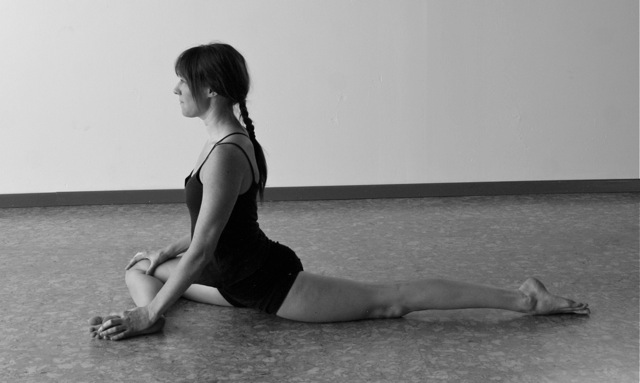
Swan Pose in Yin Yoga is similar to Salamba Kapotasana. For the 'sleeping' variant, the body is reclined forwards over the bent leg.

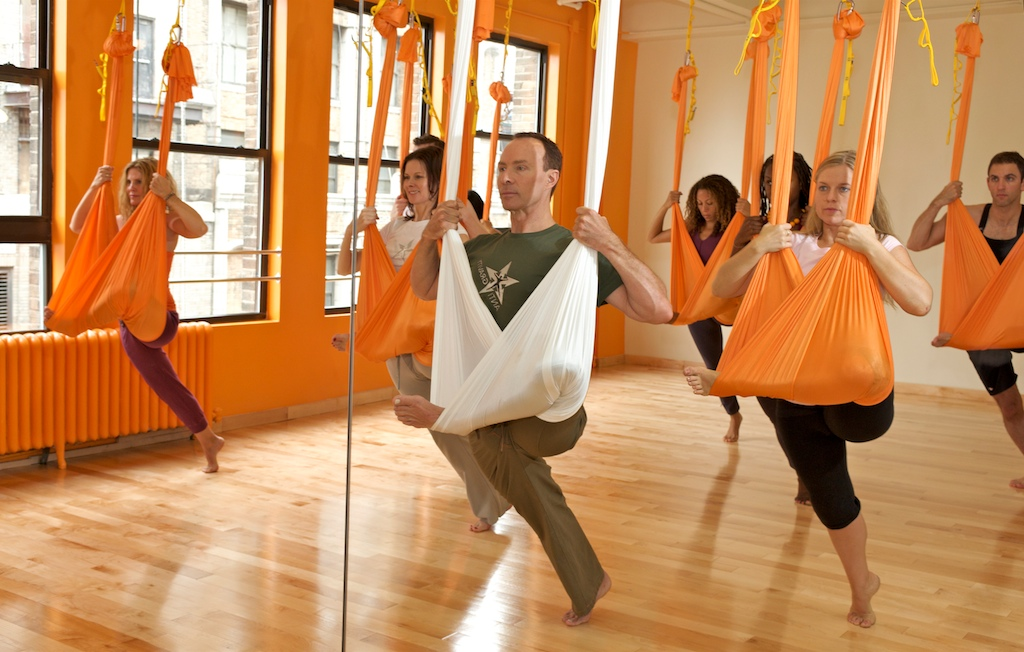
Aerial yoga class practising Flying Pigeon Pose, a hammock-supported variant

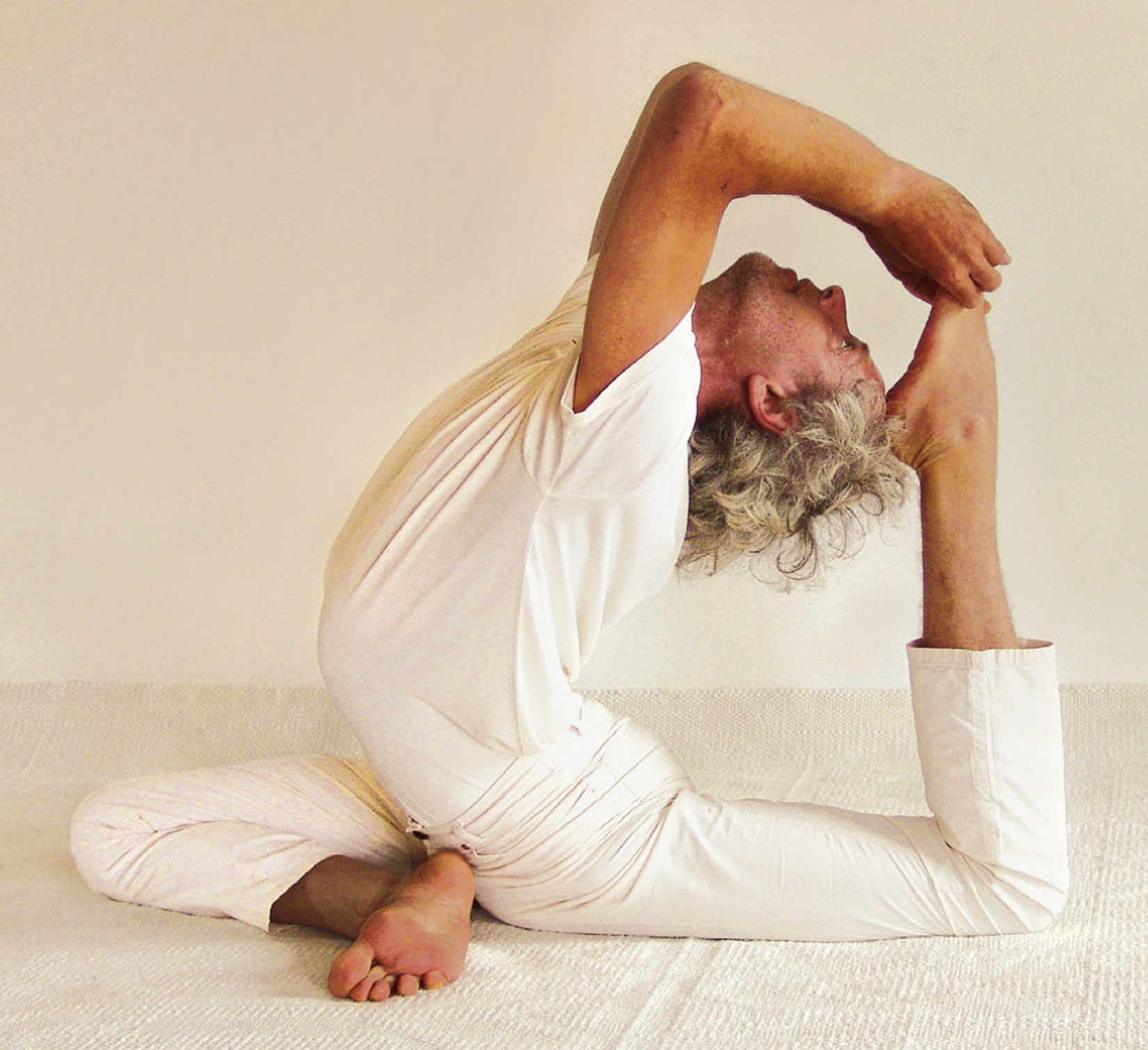
Variation with both hands grasping the rear foot

=== Eka Pada Rajakapotasana II, III, and IV ===
For Eka Pada Rajakapotasana II, the hands and the rear foot are as for Rajakapotasana I, but the sole of the front foot is on the floor in front of the hip, and the front knee is sharply bent with the knee forwards of the foot; the hips are off the ground.

In Eka Pada Rajakapotasana III, the hands and the rear foot are as for Rajakapotasana I, but according to Iyengar Yoga the front knee points forwards, with the front foot and lower leg on the ground beneath the thigh.

For Eka Pada Rajakapotasana IV, the hands and the rear foot are as for Rajakapotasana I, but the front foot is stretched straight forwards along the ground. The pose may be practised using props: the rear lower leg vertically up a wall, a yoga block under the sitting bones, another block if needed under the front leg, and a strap between the hands and the rear foot.

== See also ==
- Anjaneyasana, the closely related Crescent Moon pose, with the front foot on the floor and the front knee raised
- Kapotasana, Pigeon pose
