= FTM Fitness World =

American fitness company

- Type: Private
- Industry: Fitness; wellness
- Founded: 2012
- Founder: Neo Sandja
- Headquarters: Atlanta, Georgia, United States
- Key people: Neo Sandja (Founder and President)
- Products: Fitness events; conferences
- Services: Fitness training; wellness programs; event organization
- Website: ftmfitnessworld.com

FTM Fitness World is a company created in 2012 in Atlanta, Georgia, US, by Neo Sandja, a transgender man. In 2014, it launched its first annual conference dedicated to the transgender community.

The conference aimed to improve their lives of the transgender community in five main areas: wellness (including health, fitness, and nutrition), spirituality, relationships, finances and personal development. The conference was three days long and included the first historical bodybuilding competition for transgender people, won by Shawn Stinson.

The second annual competition in 2015, known as TransFitCon, was the first to be covered by mainstream media. In the third annual competition, the organization added a powerlifting competition with transgender powerlifter Janae Marie Kroc as the head judge, rebranding the competition as the International Association of Trans Bodybuilders. Since then, competitions have been held every year, with divisions for lightweight, middleweight, heavyweight, and masters competitors. Originally just for transgender men, open-gender divisions were added in 2018, and transgender women's divisions was added in 2019. The transgender male and female categories determine eligibility based on hormone replacement therapy status, while the open category is open to all competitors.

== Reception ==
Some participating athletes, being able to participate as their experienced gender, in clothing that aligned with their gender, stated that the event was gender affirming. Others noted the empowering nature of bodybuilding as a sport, and the welcoming community.
