= Masters Guinot-Mary Cohr =

Defunct tennis tournament
- Founded: 2009
- Abolished: 2012
- Location: Rueil-Malmaison, Paris; France
- Venue: Paris Golf and Country Club (2009-present)
- Surface: Clay court
- Website: guinotmarycohrmasters.com

The Masters Guinot-Mary Cohr was a tennis team exhibition event played on clay the week before the French Open. It features two teams, Guinot (Red) and Mary Cohr (Green). Both are made up of five players and 1 playing captain. The captains have been Marat Safin, James Blake, David Ferrer, and Michaël Llodra. Team Guinot currently hold a 2-1 series lead over team Mary Cohr, with the most recent tie (2012) being won by team Mary Cohr. Each match is played best-of-three sets, with a match tiebreak in place of a third set.

Four editions were held from 2009 to 2012, after which the sponsor, Guinot-Mary Cohr withdrew its support. The 2013 edition was cancelled while other sponsorship was sought. "Guinot" and "Mary Cohr" are brands of cosmetics sold by the Guinot-Mary Cohr group.

== 2009 ==
Team Guinot won the tie by 4 matches to 2 after James Blake had the chance to make the tie a draw in the final rubber.

Guinot
4
Paris Golf and Country Club, Paris
20–22 May 2009
Clay (outdoors)
Mary Cohr
2

			1	2	3
1	(United Kingdom) (France)	Andy Murray; Paul-Henri Mathieu	4; 6	7; 6	[8] [10]
2	(France) (Cyprus)	Gaël Monfils; Marcos Baghdatis	4; 6	0; 6
3	(Switzerland) (Switzerland)	Roger Federer; Stanislas Wawrinka	6; 2	6; 4
4	(Spain) (France)	Rafael Nadal; Arnaud Clément	6; 3	6; 3
5	(Spain) (France)	Tommy Robredo; Fabrice Santoro	6; 2	6; 3
6	(Russia) (United States)	Marat Safin (Guinot Captain); James Blake (Mary Cohr Captain)	6; 4	7; 6

== 2010 ==
Team Guinot won the tie by 4 matches to 2. After David Ferrer had the chance to leave the tie at a 3 all in the final rubber.

Guinot
4
Paris Golf and Country Club, Paris
19–21 May 2010
Clay (outdoors)
Mary Cohr
2

			1	2	3
1	(France) (Switzerland)	Jo Wilfried Tsonga; Stanislas Wawrinka	5; 7	6; 4	[11] [9]
2	(Chile) (France)	Fernando González; Sébastien Grosjean	6; 3	6; 2
3	(Germany) (Switzerland)	Rainer Schüttler; Roger Federer	6; 4	3; 6	[5] [10]
4	(United Kingdom) (United States)	Andy Murray; Mardy Fish	7^{7} 6^{5}	6^{4} 7^{7}	[11] [9]
5	(Russia) (United States)	Mikhail Youzhny; Andy Roddick	3; 6	2; 6
6	(France) (Spain)	Michaël Llodra (Guinot Captain); David Ferrer (Mary Cohr Captain)	7; 6	6; 2

== 2011 ==
The tie ended in a draw at 3 matches all, after Team Guinot Captain Richard Gasquet won the final rubber.

Guinot
3
Paris Golf and Country Club, Paris
18–20 May 2011
Clay (outdoors)
Mary Cohr
3

			1	2	3
1	(France) (Switzerland)	Jo-Wilfried Tsonga; Stanislas Wawrinka	6; 2	7^{8} 6^{6}
2	(France) (France)	Jérémy Chardy; Gaël Monfils	2; 6	6^{11} 7^{13}
3	(France) (France)	Jo-Wilfried Tsonga; Nicolas Mahut	6; 3	6; 4
4	(France) (France)	Michaël Llodra; Julien Benneteau	1; 6	2; 6
5	(Croatia) (France)	Ivan Ljubičić; Gilles Simon	6^{7} 7^{9}	6; 4	[12] [14]
6	(France) (Spain)	Richard Gasquet (Guinot Captain); Fernando Verdasco (Mary Cohr Captain)	6; 3	4; 6	[10] [8]

*Note: Ivan Ljubičić replaced Kei Nishikori, who withdrew due to sickness. Lleyton Hewitt, who had just returned from surgery, withdrew and was replaced by Nicolas Mahut. Novak Djokovic was originally due to play Mahut after Hewitt pulled out. However Djokovic needed to rest in preparation for the French Open. Thus Jo-Wilfried Tsonga replaced him to play his second match of the tournament. Then Julien Benneteau replaced Andy Murray when the latter pulled out with a groin injury.
