= Scott Salmon =

American choreographer (1943–1993)

Scott Salmon (January 13, 1943 – July 17, 1993) was an American choreographer, dancer, and musical theatre actor. He earned both Tony Award and Emmy Award nominations for his work as a choreographer.

== Life and career ==
Born in Wichita Falls, Texas on January 13, 1943, Salmon attended the University of Oklahoma where he graduated with a bachelor's degree in music education in 1965. He was a dancer in the original Broadway cast of Mame (1966) starring Angela Lansbury, and subsequently portrayed multiple roles in George M! (1968). His other Broadway credits as a performer included work as a dancer in Promises, Promises and the role of Jack in the revue That's Entertainment (1972).

Salmon was a longtime choreographer for the Miss America pageant. He was nominated for the Tony Award for Best Choreography at the 38th Tony Awards for his work choreographing the original production of La Cage aux Folles. He subsequently choreographed the 57th Academy Awards, and for this work was nominated for the Primetime Emmy Award for Outstanding Choreography at the 37th Primetime Emmy Awards. He also choreographed the music sequences in the film Torch Song Trilogy (1988), and from 1990 until his death three years later was the choreographer for Radio City Music Hall's Christmas and Easter shows.

Salmon died in Northridge, California on July 17, 1993 at the age of 50 from injuries sustained in an automobile accident.
