= Barre (ballet) =

Apparatus for ballet exercises

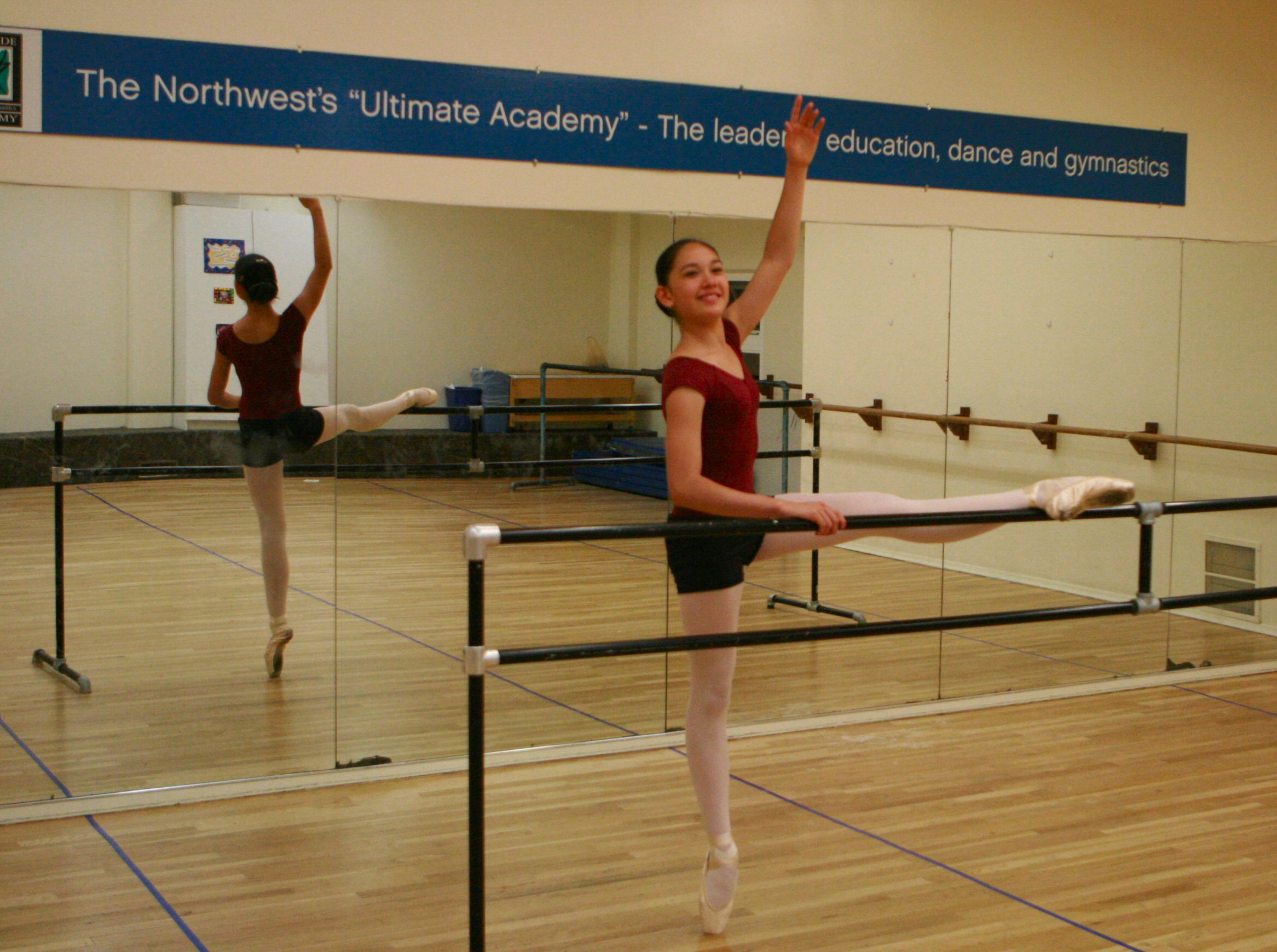
A ballet dancer doing barre exercises at a portable barre. A permanent barre can be seen in the reflected background, mounted to the wall, to the right.

A barre (French pronunciation: [baʁ]) is a stationary handrail that provides support for people during various types of exercise. Barres are used extensively in ballet training and warm up exercises, where such exercises are commonly referred to as barre work. In a ballet class, barre may also refer to the part of the class that involves barre work. Barres are also used for warm up exercises in other types of dance, as well as in general fitness programs.

== Construction ==
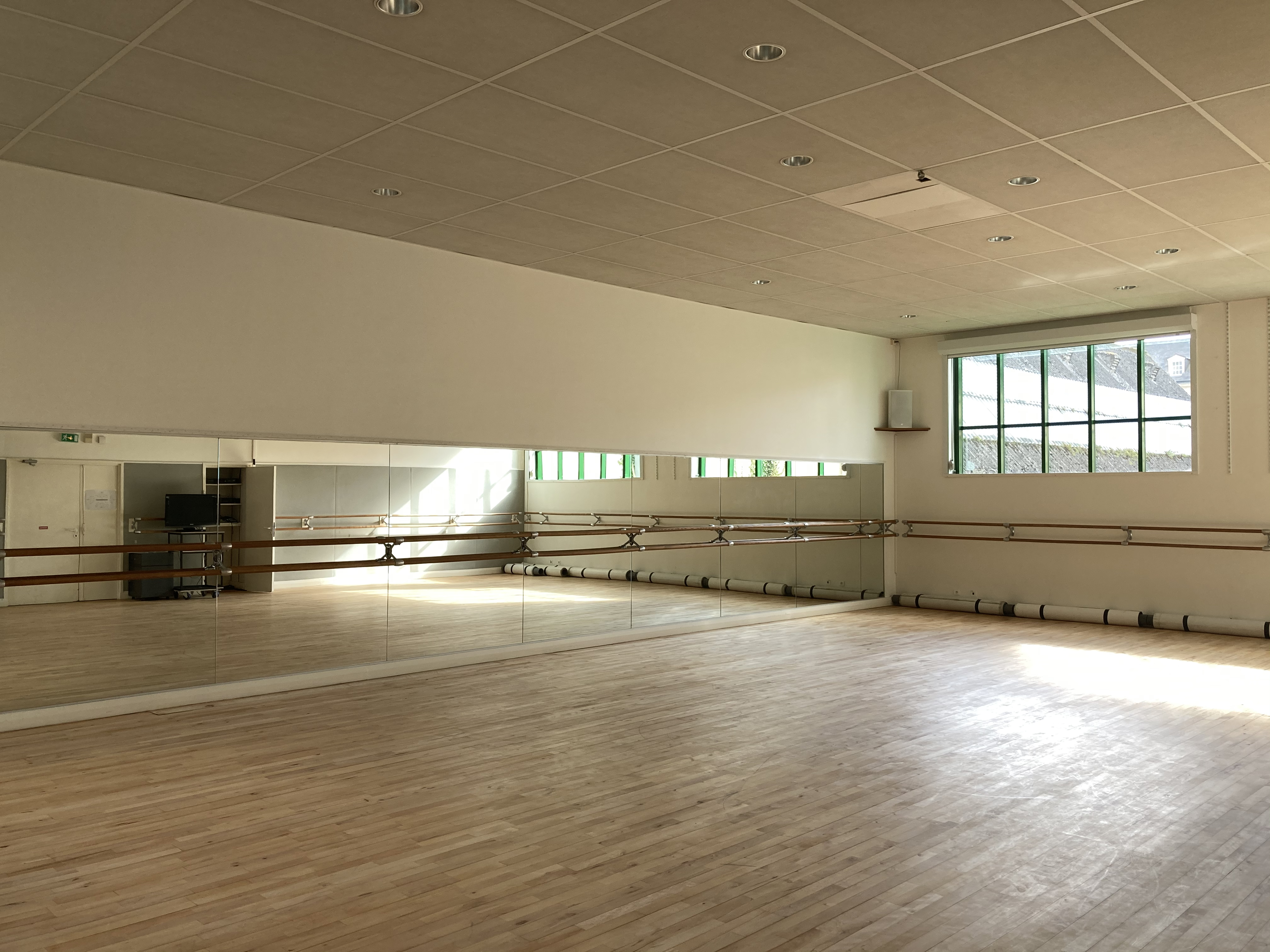
Barre rail fixed to the walls in a dance studio

The design of a barre—which includes both the handrail and its support mechanism—depends on whether the barre is to be portable or permanently located. A permanent barre typically consists of a handrail that is mounted to and supported by a wall, whereas a portable barre consists of a handrail mounted onto a rigid or adjustable, free-standing supporting structure.

Barre height is typically near waist level of a dancer. Some barres have two parallel handrails at different heights to accommodate people of differing heights. Barre handrails and supports are typically made of metal, wood, plastic, or a combination of these materials.

== Exercises ==
=== Ballet ===
In ballet, barre work includes both slow and fast exercises, which both serve to strengthen muscles. Slow exercises are typically performed first, to stretch and warm up muscles, and to focus on proper body form, whereas fast exercises condition dancers to maintain precise ballet technique while moving. Each exercise has a specific purpose, such as to strengthen feet and legs, increase extension, improve flexibility, and develop ballon. Proper form (posture, positions of feet and arms) is strived for in all exercises.

A barre helps dancers by providing a means of stability and balance and, consequently, barre work often comprises a significant portion of the beginning dancer's class. It is an essential tool when first learning foot placement technique, and also for beginning pointe dancers, who have not yet developed the strength and technique needed for pointe work. The barre continues to be an important tool in all levels of ballet. Barre work helps dancers prepare for partnering, with the barre simulating the support of a real partner.

=== General fitness ===
When used for promoting general fitness, barre exercises may incorporate a wide variety of activities to increase stamina, flexibility and strength, including ballet movements that require balance and stimulate the core such as pliés and pirouettes.

Barre classes have become a popularized form of exercise. A barre class includes the use of the barre as a tool for repetitions of small, pulsing movements with emphasis on form, alignment and core engagement. Devices such as yoga straps, exercise balls and hand weights are sometimes used during barre classes. Barre classes draw from yoga as well as dance and Pilates and focus on breath and the mind-body connection.
