= Corporate entertainment =

Events held by corporations or businesses

Corporate entertainment describes private events held by corporations or businesses for their staff, clients or stakeholders. These events can be for large audiences such as conventions and conferences, or smaller events such as retreats, holiday parties or even private concerts, often including activities like team-building exercises and award ceremonies.

Corporate entertainment can also incorporate elements such as live performances, themed activities, and tailored hospitality services designed to enhance guest engagement and create memorable experiences.

It is also commonly used to mean corporate hospitality, the process of entertaining guests at corporate events.

The companies that provide corporate entertainment are called corporate event planners or corporate booking agencies. The corporate event industry is a growing business and projected to reach $1.6 trillion by 2028.

== Types of corporate entertainment events ==
There are various types of corporate events that make use of entertainment. An opening general session may include entertainment that adds excitement and presents the overall theme of the meeting. Mixers or pre-dinner parties many times use entertainment meant to provide a backdrop for conversation, perhaps an acoustic ensemble or pre-recorded music. Awards or gala events, usually the last event in a series of meetings, can make use of many options, from celebrity entertainers to exciting bands providing dance music or other options that will leave the attendees with a feeling of excitement and looking forward to the next meeting. There are many different types of corporate entertainment.

=== Corporate team building ===
Corporate entertainment can also include a day of team building activities. These activities include traditional camp activities like tug of war, scavenger hunts, and relay races. They could also include sports such as volleyball, soccer, or basketball. The goal of team building corporate entertainment is to have employees recognize how the challenges of the activities relate to the workplace. Team chemistry, identifying strengths and attributes, understanding how to work through solving problems as one, and reflecting makes for fruitful team building.

=== Corporate awards events ===
Awards or gala events are usually lavish events that celebrate accomplishment or milestones of a person or group of people in similar industries. Often these events serve as fundraisers for a specific cause. In addition to celebrating and recognizing achievements, it allows attendees to network with others with similar backgrounds or professions.

=== Corporate holiday celebration events ===
Holiday celebration events are ways for companies or departments to celebrate holidays and to show appreciation to employees. Entertainment at these events vary from raffles and door prizes, mystery dinners, music and an overall casual, social setting that can build social relationships. For Christmas celebrations, some companies have used the A Christmas Story theme.

=== Corporate seminars and educational events ===
Corporate seminars, workshops, symposiums, and conferences are more informative in nature and often focussed on educational purposes. A conference refers to a formal meeting where participants exchange their views on various topics. A seminar is a form of academic instruction, either at a university or offered by a commercial or professional organization. A workshop includes all the elements of the seminar, but with the largest portion emphasizing “hands-on-practice” or laboratory work. A symposium is a formal gathering in an academic setting where participants are experts in their fields. Entertainment for these events varies from kick-op brunches to start, special industry guest speakers, and mixers, dinners afterwards. There are also booths set up for trade shows to display a companies strengths and for better marketing.

=== Corporate charity events ===
Corporate charity events, whether concerts, golf tournaments, or anything else, play an important role in how businesses interact with the community. Corporate charity events unite people from all levels of the organization; such events are another form of team building which positively influence other aspects of work.
